= Coordination polymerization =

Coordination polymerisation is a form of polymerization that is catalyzed by transition metal salts and complexes.

== Types of coordination polymerization of alkenes ==
=== Heterogeneous catalysts ===
Coordination polymerization started in the 1950s with heterogeneous Ziegler–Natta catalysts based on titanium tetrachloride and organoaluminium co-catalysts. The mixing of TiCl_{4} with trialkylaluminium complexes produces Ti(III)-containing solids that catalyze the polymerization of ethylene and propylene. The nature of the catalytic center remains uncertain and more than one kind of site may be active. Many additives and variations have been reported for the original recipes. The other major family of coordination catalysts are the Phillips catalyst. Approximately half of the world's polyethylene using this species.

=== Homogeneous Ziegler–Natta polymerization ===
In some applications heterogeneous Ziegler–Natta polymerization has been superseded by homogeneous catalysts such as the Kaminsky catalyst discovered in the 1970s. The 1990s brought forward a new range of post-metallocene catalysts. Typical monomers are nonpolar ethene and propene. These catalysts are generated in situ (reminiscent of the Ziegler-Natta catalysts, but their structures are well-defined.

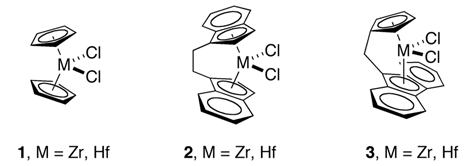
Illustrative metallocene-based coordination catalysts

Kaminsky catalysts are based on metallocenes of group 4 metals (Ti, Zr, Hf) activated with methylaluminoxane (MAO). Polymerizations catalysed by metallocenes occur via the Cossee–Arlman mechanism. The active site is usually anionic but cationic coordination polymerization also exists.

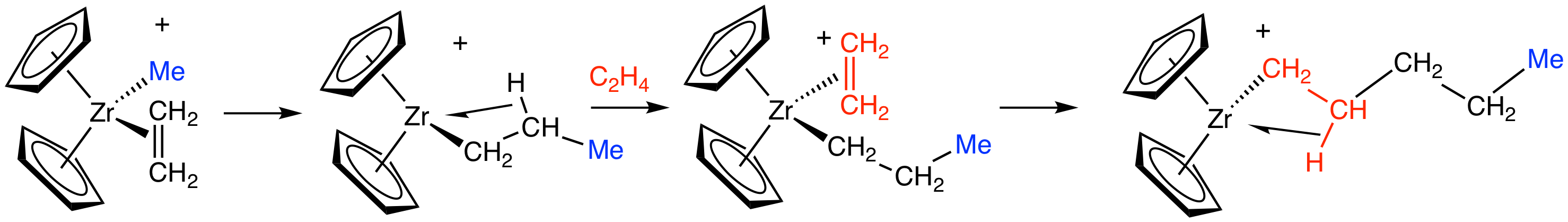
Simplified mechanism for Zr-catalyzed ethene polymerization

=== Specialty monomers ===
Many alkenes do not polymerize in the presence of Ziegler–Natta or Kaminsky systems, which are highly active for ethylene and propylene. This problem applies to polar olefins such as vinyl chloride, vinyl ethers, and acrylate esters. Instead, these polymerizations are effected on a large scale by other kinds of catalysts, such as free-radicals.

Also of interest are copolymers derived from ethylene with polar monomers. One such material of significant commercial value is ethylene-vinyl acetate copolymer. It is produced by free-radical methods. Much effort has been devoted to possible coordination polymerization of such mixed nonpolar/polar monomers. Traditional Ziegler-Natta, Phillips, and Kaminsky catalysts are poisoned by polar monomers. This predicament has led to a focus on catalysis by "softer" metals such as palladium and nickel. These efforts have not led to commercial processes.

=== Butadiene polymerization ===
The annual production of polybutadiene is 2.1 million tons (2000). The process employs a neodymium-based homogeneous catalyst.

=== Principles ===
Coordination polymerization has a great impact on the physical properties of vinyl polymers such as polyethylene and polypropylene compared to the same polymers prepared by other techniques such as free-radical polymerization. The polymers tend to be linear and not branched and have much higher molar mass. Coordination type polymers are also stereoregular and can be isotactic or syndiotactic instead of just atactic. This tacticity introduces crystallinity in otherwise amorphous polymers. From these differences in polymerization type the distinction originates between low-density polyethylene (LDPE), high-density polyethylene (HDPE) or even ultra-high-molecular-weight polyethylene (UHMWPE).

== Coordination polymerization of other substrates ==
Coordination polymerization can also be applied to non-alkene substrates. Dehydrogenative coupling of silanes, dihydro- and trihydrosilanes, to polysilanes has been investigated, although the technology has not been commercialized. The process entails coordination and often oxidative addition of Si-H centers to metal complexes.

Lactides also polymerize in the presence of Lewis acidic catalysts to give polylactide:

== See also ==
- Cossee–Arlman mechanism
- Ziegler–Natta catalyst
- Polymerization
- Coordination bond
