= Linear low-density polyethylene =

Polymer

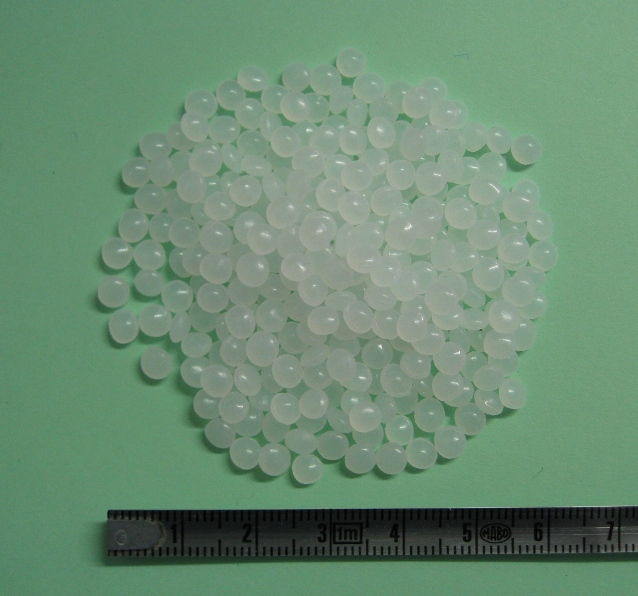
Linear low-density polyethylene (LLDPE) granules

Linear low-density polyethylene (LLDPE) is one of several varieties of polyethylene (PE). PE, the dominant synthetic polymer, is produced in many forms that differ in terms of molecular weight, branching, and the incorporation of comonomers. Often these features are captured in terms of the density of the material. All forms of PE are colorless, odorless, rather chemically inert solids produced by the polymerization of ethylene, the monomer. LLDPE is a substantially linear polymer (polyethylene), with significant numbers of short branches.

== Properties ==
PE's are often classified by their densities.

Polyethylene (PE) densities and structure
PE type	density (g/cm^{3})	structure
LDPE	ca. 0.924	highly branched
LLDPE	0.916-0.940	contains comonomers
HDPE	ca. 0.961	no branching

LLDPE has higher tensile strength and higher impact and puncture resistance than LDPE has. It is very flexible and elongates under stress. It can be used to make thinner films, with better environmental stress cracking resistance. It has good resistance to chemicals. It has good electrical properties. However, it is not as easy to process as LDPE, has lower gloss, and narrower range for heat sealing.

== Production ==
The polymerization process can be done either in solution phase or in gas phase reactors.

The production of LLDPE is conducted by coordination polymerization. In contrast, conventional low-density polyethylene (LDPE) is produced by free-radical polymerization.

=== Catalysts ===
In coordination polymerization, metals bind ("coordinate") the monomer, allowing them to link. Major coordination catalysts include Ziegler-Natta (often titanium-based), Phillips (chromium-based), and Kaminsky catalysts (titanium- and zirconium-based). LLDPE that is manufactured by using metallocenes is sometimes labeled as mLLDPE. Such catalysts can produce polymers with densities even below 0.91 g/cm^{3}. These are sometimes called "very low density polyethylene" (VLDPE) or "ultra low density polyethylene" (ULDPE). However, synthesis of LLDPE polymers with high levels of comonomers and a "common" Ziegler-Natta catalyst has also been shown to yield polymers with a density below 0.91 g/cm^{3}.

=== Comonomers ===
It is commonly made by copolymerization of ethylene with alpha-olefins such as butene, hexene, or octene. The amount of comonomer is typically in the range from 1 to 10%. The copolymerization process produces an LLDPE polymer that has a narrower molecular weight distribution than conventional LDPE and in combination with the linear structure, significantly different rheological properties.

== Processing ==
LDPE and LLDPE have unique rheological or melt flow properties. LLDPE is less shear sensitive because of its narrower molecular weight distribution and shorter chain branching. During a shearing process, such as extrusion, LLDPE remains more viscous and, therefore, harder to process than an LDPE of equivalent melt index. The lower shear sensitivity of LLDPE allows for a faster stress relaxation of the polymer chains during extrusion, and, therefore, the physical properties are susceptible to changes in blow-up ratios. In melt extension, LLDPE has lower viscosity at all strain rates. This means it will not strain harden the way LDPE does when elongated. As the deformation rate of the polyethylene increases, LDPE demonstrates a dramatic rise in viscosity because of chain entanglement. This phenomenon is not observed with LLDPE because of the lack of long-chain branching in LLDPE allows the chains to slide by one another upon elongation without becoming entangled. This characteristic is important for film applications because LLDPE films can be downgauged easily while maintaining high strength and toughness. The rheological properties of LLDPE are summarized as "stiff in shear" and "soft in extension". LLDPE can be recycled, though into other things like trash can liners, lumber, landscaping ties, floor tiles, compost bins, and shipping envelopes.

== Application ==
LLDPE has penetrated almost all traditional markets for polyethylene; it is used for plastic bags and sheets (where it can be thinner than LDPE of comparable strength), plastic wrap, stretch wrap, pouches, toys, covers, lids, pipes, buckets and containers, covering of cables, geomembranes, and mainly flexible tubing. It is also common to use blends of LDPE and LLDPE for optimal material properties in specific applications.

In 2013, the world market for LLDPE reached a volume of $40 billion.

== See also ==
- Cross-linked polyethylene (XLPE/PEX)
- High-density polyethylene (HDPE)
- Low-density polyethylene (LDPE)
- Medium-density polyethylene (MDPE)
- Plastic recycling
- Stretch wrap
- Ultra-high-molecular-weight polyethylene (UHMWPE)
