= Ansa-metallocene =

Organometallic compound

Structure of a generic ansa-metallocene. X is the linker group, often (CH_{2})_{n} or R_{2}Si (R = alkyl). L_{n} refers to additional ligands that may reside on the metal M.

An ansa-metallocene is a type of organometallic compound containing two cyclopentadienyl ligands that are linked by a bridging group such that both cyclopentadienyl groups are bound to the same metal. The link prevents rotation of the cyclopentadienyl ligand and often modifies the structure and reactivity of the metal center. Some ansa-metallocenes are active in Ziegler-Natta catalysis, although none are used commercially. The term ansa-metallocene (ansa being Greek for "handle") was coined by Lüttringhaus and Kullick to describe alkylidene-bridged ferrocenes, which were developed in the 1950s.

Often ansa-metallocenes are described in terms of the angle defined by the two Cp rings. In titanocene dichloride, this angle is 58.5° whereas in the ansa-titanocene Me_{2}Si(C_{5}H_{4})_{2}TiCl_{2} the angle is 51.2°.

The prototypical linker groups are of the type (CH_{2})_{n} where n = 1, 2, and 3. More easily installed are linker groups consisting of heteroatoms, e.g. (CH_{3})_{2}Si. Small linker groups require non-coplanar Cp rings, and thus introduce strain into the resulting complex. Some undergo ring-opening polymerization.

One potential application of ansa-metallocenes is in polymerisation reactions. Specifically, the ansa bridge allows greater control of the stereochemistry at the metal centre. For example, three distinct ansa-zirconocene dichloride catalysts used in the synthesis of polypropylene in the presence of methylaluminoxane (MAO) can be used to direct whether the product is syndiotactic, isotactic, or atactic.

Three views of ansa-dimethylsilylhafnocene dichloride (from X-ray coordinates).

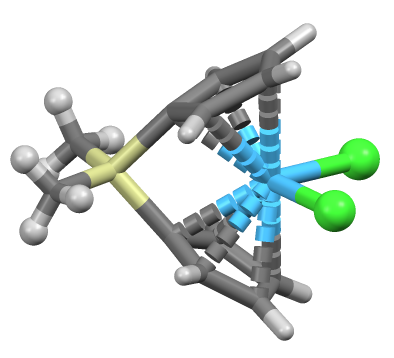

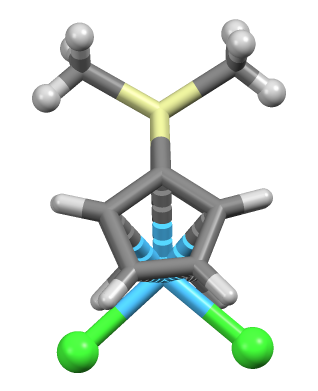

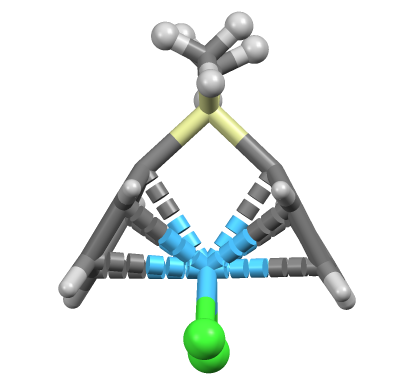
