= Amorphous poly alpha olefin =

Amorphous poly alpha olefin (APAO; also known as atactic poly alpha olefin) is a commodity chemical used in multiple applications.

== History ==
In the mid-to-late-1950s, atactic polypropylene (APP) was a by-product of the synthesis of isotactic polypropylene (iPP) using first and early second generation Ziegler–Natta catalysts (Z-N catalysts), which typically produced about 10-15 wt% of APP. Polymerization reactions using those catalysts were based on solution processes that simplified the elimination of the APP due to solubility differences. In other processes, such as slurry or suspension, the APP had to be eliminated from the isotactic fraction by washing/extracting the polypropylene product with hydrocarbon solvents.

With the development in the 1980s of more active and stereospecific supported Z-N catalysts, the proportion of atactic polymer to crystalline isotactic polypropylene in the polymers produced was substantially reduced, to typically less than 2 or 3 wt%. Therefore, the polypropylene product generally did not require additional purification steps to remove the atactic or low crystalline fraction. This meant that the APP supply from polypropylene plants using standard first- and early second-generation Z-N catalysts decreased as commercial plants adopted the new catalysts. Little by-product APP was thereafter produced.

Because APP is a by-product, it frequently has broad product specifications . Starting in the late 1970s and the early 1980s, several chemical companies identified the need to have an APP-like polymer produced to tight specifications. This type of polyolefin became known as on-purpose APAO, or just APAO, or APO. APAO synthesis and manufacture has been accomplished by properly designing the process of synthesizing the amorphous polyolefin, specifically, by the proper choice of catalyst system and the use of olefinic co-monomers. This process results in products with defined properties, such as melt viscosity, softening point, needle penetration, open time and tensile strength.

== Production ==
The amorphous polyalphaolefins are synthesized by a catalyst system based on a Z-N supported catalyst and an alkyl aluminum co-catalyst. The polymerization process produces a mostly amorphous polymer with low crystallinity. Crystallinity depends on the catalyst system and on the use of co-monomers.

== Product types ==
The four distinctive commercially available product types of on-purpose APAO are:

- Homopolymers of propylene
- Copolymers of propylene and ethylene
- Copolymers of propylene and 1-butene or other higher a-olefins
- Terpolymers of ethylene, propylene and 1-butene

== Properties ==
The composition of the APAO is typically determined by using infrared spectroscopy, specifically, Fourier-transform infrared spectroscopy (FT-IR).

Typical properties for APAO are:

- Melt viscosity (MV) - indicates processability and is typically determined at 375 °F (190 °C), as per the ASTM D-3236 or DIN 53019 test methods.
- Needle penetration (NP) - indicates resistance to deformation and hardness, and is typically determined as per ASTM D-1321, ASTM D5 or DIN EN 1426 test methods
- Ring and ball softening point (RBSP) - indicates resistance to heat, and is typically determined as per ASTM E-28 or DIN EN 1427 test methods.
- Open time (OT) - indicates how long it takes for a film of adhesive to set to a destructive bond. Typically determined as per ASTM D-4497.

Other tests carried out to determine product properties are:

- Rheology- measured with a rheometer
- Tensile strength and modulus - measures mechanical properties - measured using a tensile tester
- Molecular weight - used to obtain the molecular weight distribution, MWD, determined by Gel Permeation Chromatography, GPC
- Shear adhesion failure temperature (SAFT)
- Peel adhesion failure temperature (PAFT)

== Applications ==
Applications include:

- Adult incontinence
- Bookbinding
- Cardboard and case sealing
- Feminine hygiene
- Paper and packaging
- Paper lamination
- Personal hygiene baby diapers
- Pressure sensitive labels
- Woodworking edge banding
