= Kaminsky catalyst =

Ethylene polymerization catalyst

A Kaminsky catalyst is a catalytic system for alkene polymerization. Kaminsky catalysts are based on metallocenes of group 4 transition metals (Ti, Zr, Hf) activated with methylaluminoxane (MAO). These and other innovations have inspired development of new classes of catalysts that in turn led to commercialization of novel engineering polyolefins.

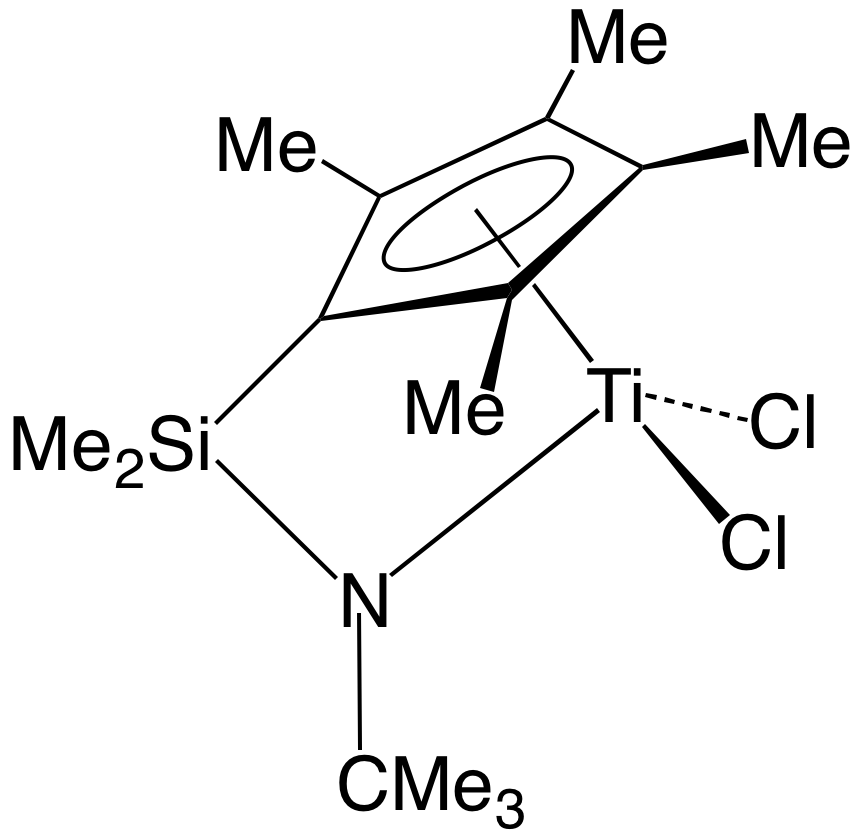
A constrained geometry organotitanium complex in the (inactive) chloride form

== Catalyst development ==
The catalyst is named after German chemist Walter Kaminsky, who first described it in 1980 along with Hansjörg Sinn and others. Prior to Kaminsky's work, titanium chlorides supported on various materials were widely used (and still are) as heterogeneous catalysts for alkene polymerization. These halides are typically activated by treatment with trimethylaluminium. Kaminsky discovered that titanocene and related complexes emulated some aspects of these Ziegler–Natta catalysts but with low activity. He subsequently found that high activity could be achieved upon activation of these metallocenes with methylaluminoxane (MAO). The MAO serves two roles: (i) alkylation of the metallocene halide and (ii) abstraction of an anionic ligand (chloride or methyl) to give an electrophilic catalyst with a labile coordination site.

== Ligand design ==
Kaminsky's discovery of well-defined, high activity homogeneous catalysts led to many innovations in the design of novel cyclopentadienyl ligands. These innovations include ansa-metallocenes, C_{s}-symmetric fluorenyl-Cp ligands, constrained geometry catalysts, Some Kaminsky-inspired catalysts use of chiral metallocenes that have bridged cyclopentadienyl rings. These innovations made possible highly stereoselective (or stereoregular) polymerization of α-olefins, some of which have been commercialized.

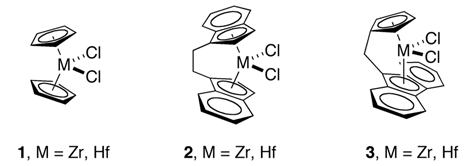
Using metallocene 1 for polymerization of propene gives atactic polypropylene, while C_{2} symmetric metallocene 2 and C_{s} symmetric metallocene 3 catalytic systems produce isotactic polymer and syndiotactic polymer, respectively.
