= Giulio Natta =

Italian chemist (1903–1979)

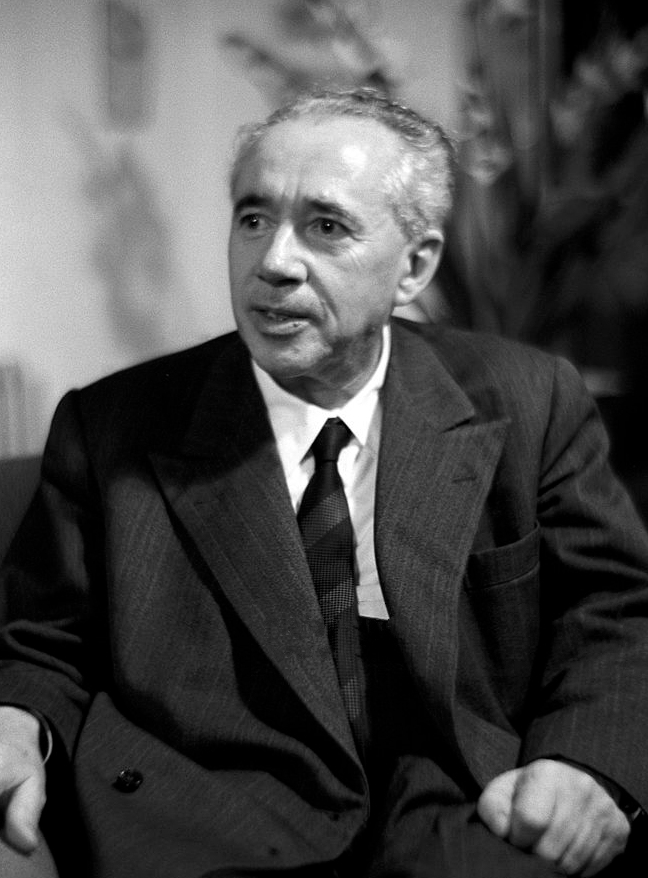
- Giulio Natta
- Born: 26 February 1903; Imperia, Kingdom of Italy
- Died: 2 May 1979 (aged 76); Bergamo, Italy
- Education: Politecnico di Milano
- Known for: Natta projection Ziegler–Natta catalyst Polypropylene
- Awards: Nobel Prize in Chemistry (1963); Lomonosov Gold Medal (1969)
- Scientific career
- Fields: Organic chemistry
- Workplaces: Pavia University; University of Rome La Sapienza; Politecnico di Torino; Politecnico di Milano

Signature
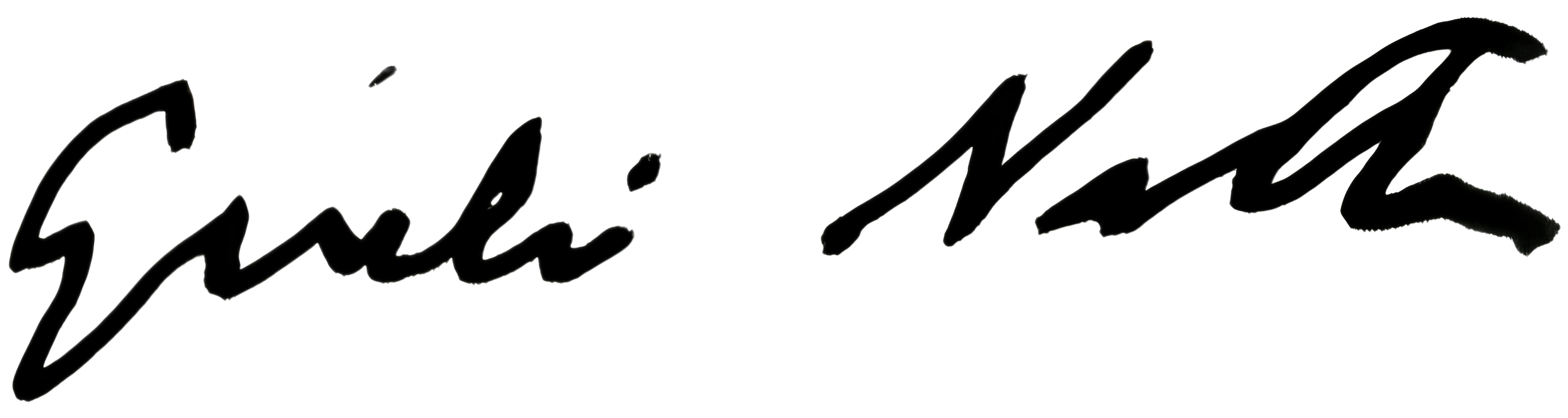

Giulio Natta (Italian: [ˈd͡ʒu.ljo ˈnat.ta]; 26 February 1903 – 2 May 1979) was an Italian chemical engineer and Nobel laureate. Natta's work at Politecnico di Milano led to the improvement of earlier work by Karl Ziegler and to the development of the Ziegler–Natta catalyst. The discoveries of Natta and Ziegler revolutionized polymer science by enabling the low-pressure, stereospecific polymerization of olefins, particularly propylene, into highly ordered, crystalline structures (isotactic polypropylene). This development allowed the production of high-strength plastics that were previously unobtainable. Natta won a Nobel Prize in Chemistry in 1963 with Karl Ziegler for his work on high density polymer. He also received a Lomonosov Gold Medal in 1969.

== Biography ==
=== Early years ===
Natta was born in Imperia, Italy to a well-to-do family. After high school, he enrolled at the University of Genoa to study pure mathematics. He then moved to the Polytechnic University of Milan, where he earned his degree in chemical engineering in 1924. In 1927 he passed the exams for becoming a professor there. From 1929 to 1933, he was also in charge of physical chemistry at the Faculty of Sciences of the University of Milan. In 1933 he became a full professor and the director of the Institute of General Chemistry of Pavia University, where he stayed until 1935. During this time he began using crystallography to elucidate the structures of a wide variety of molecules including phosphine, arsine and others. In that year he was appointed full professor in physical chemistry at the University of Rome.

=== Career ===
From 1936 to 1938 Natta moved as a full professor and director of the Institute of Industrial Chemistry at the Polytechnic Institute of Turin. In 1938 he took over as the head of the Department of chemical engineering at the Politecnico di Milano university, in a somewhat controversial manner, when his predecessor Mario Giacomo Levi was forced to step down because of racial laws against Jews being introduced in Fascist Italy.

From the early 1920s onwards, Natta conducted extensive theoretical and experimental research. He was a pioneer in using X-ray diffraction (diffractometry) to analyze the microscopic structure of inorganic compounds and crystalline solids. His studies revealed a striking relationship between the crystalline structure of chemical catalysts and their performance.

In the early 1930s, he successfully developed a new methanol synthesis process in collaboration with Montecatini, breaking the monopoly held by German industries in this sector for the first time. From that point on, Natta focused on the technical, practical and industrial applications of theoretical chemistry – a focus that characterised his entire career. In 1938, he contributed to the construction of the first synthetic rubber production plant in Italy, in Ferrara. After the war, Natta returned to macromolecular chemistry, studying the applications of ultrasound in polymer chemistry.

In the summer of 1947, Natta and Pier Giustiniani, the director of Montecatini, travelled to the United States to familiarise themselves with scientific and technological research in chemistry overseas. They noted some differences with respect to Europe, such as the growing American interest in petrochemistry. Upon his return, Giustiniani provided Natta and the Milan Polytechnic with funding and facilities for a new advanced chemical research centre, which would operate in synergy with the Industrial Chemistry Research Centre of the National Research Council (established by Natta in 1946) and the Institute of Industrial Chemistry of the Milan Polytechnic.

From the early 1950s onwards, Natta developed a keen interest in the stereochemistry of polymers and macromolecules in general. He became interested in the studies conducted by Karl Ziegler on organometallic catalysts at the Max Planck Institute for Coal Research. Natta recognised the potential of these catalytic organometallic polymerisation processes and used them to obtain very linear, crystalline polymers from monomers such as ethylene. Natta compared the linear structure of these polymers with the branched structure typical of high polymers. Ziegler's subsequent production of high-density linear polyethylene using the same ethylene polymerisation processes but different catalysts led Natta to apply the same approach to polypropylene and other higher alpha-olefins using variants of Ziegler-type catalysts. On 11 March 1954, a new organic compound with a highly ordered crystalline structure was obtained; this was later called isotactic polypropylene.

The invention of these new catalysts for stereospecific polymerisation, which would later be called Ziegler-Natta catalysts, earned Natta and Ziegler the Nobel Prize in Chemistry in 1963. The subsequent patents filed by Natta from the mid-1950s formed the basis for the global industrial production of isotactic polypropylene. In 1961, with the approval of the National Research Council, Natta founded a new macromolecular chemistry research institute. Many researchers and professors were trained there, going on to work at various universities and public and private research centres, as well as in management roles in public and private companies, both Italian and foreign.

=== Personal life ===
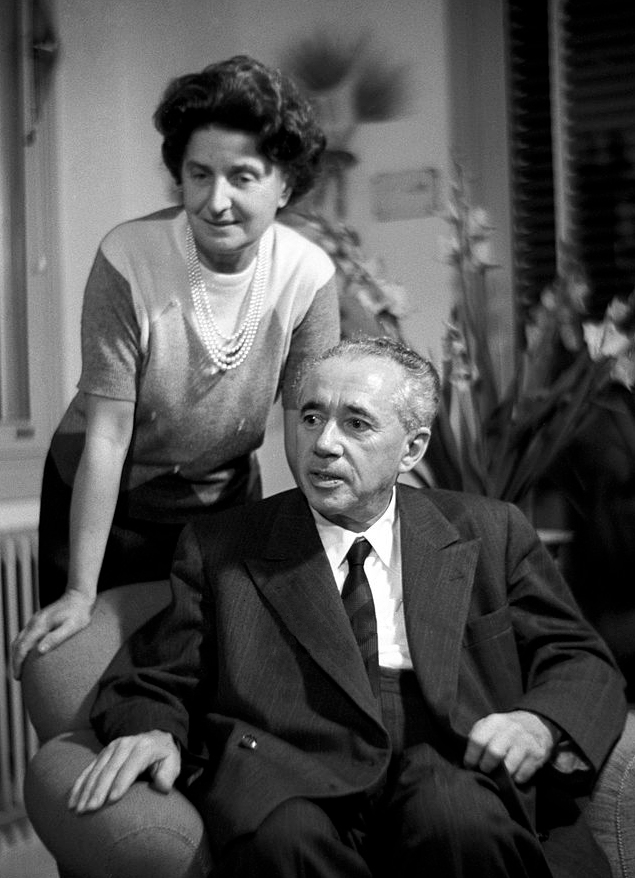
Giulio Natta with wife in the 1960s

Natta was a member of several prominent academies, including the Accademia dei Lincei (1955), the New York Academy of Sciences (1960), the French Academy of Sciences (1964) and the Academy of Sciences of the Soviet Union (1966).

In 1935 Natta married Rosita Beati; a graduate in literature, she coined the terms "isotactic", "atactic" and "syndiotactic" for polymers discovered by her husband. They had two children, Giuseppe and Franca. Rosita died in 1968.

Natta was diagnosed with Parkinson's disease in 1956. By 1963, his condition had progressed to the point that he required the assistance of his son and four colleagues to present his speech at the Nobel ceremonies in Stockholm. Natta died in Bergamo, Italy at age 76.

== See also ==
- Polypropylene
