= Catalyst support =

Porous material with a high specific surface area supporting a catalyst

In the Phillips catalyst, used for about half of the industrial production of polyethylene, the chromium catalyst is supported on silica.

In chemistry, a catalyst support or carrier is a material, usually a solid with a high surface area, to which a catalyst is affixed. The activity of heterogeneous catalysts is mainly promoted by atoms present at the accessible surface of the material. Consequently, great effort is made to maximize the specific surface area of a catalyst. One popular method for increasing surface area involves distributing the catalyst over the surface of the support. The support may be inert or participate in the catalytic reactions. Typical supports include various kinds of activated carbon, alumina, and silica.

== Applying catalysts to supports ==
Two main methods are used to prepare supported catalysts. In the impregnation method, a suspension of the solid support is treated with a solution of a precatalyst, and the resulting material is then activated under conditions that will convert the precatalyst (often a metal salt) to a more active state, perhaps the metal itself. In such cases, the catalyst support is usually in the form of pellets. Alternatively, supported catalysts can be prepared from homogeneous solution by co-precipitation. For example, an acidic solution of aluminium salts and precatalyst are treated with base to precipitate the mixed hydroxide, which is subsequently calcined.

Supports are usually thermally very stable and withstand processes required to activate precatalysts. For example, many precatalysts are activated by exposure to a stream of hydrogen at high temperatures. Similarly, catalysts become fouled after extended use, and in such cases they are sometimes re-activated by oxidation-reduction cycles, again at high temperatures. The Phillips catalyst, consisting of chromium oxide supported on silica, is activated by a stream of hot air.

=== Spillover ===
Supports are often viewed as inert: catalysis occurs at the catalytic "islands" and the support exists to provide high surface areas. Various experiments indicate that this model is often oversimplified. It is known for example that adsorbates, such as hydrogen and oxygen, can interact with and even migrate from island to island across the support without re-entering the gas phase. This process where adsorbates migrate to and from the support is called spillover. It is envisaged, for example, that hydrogen can "spill" onto oxidic support as hydroxy groups.

== Catalyst leaching ==
A common problem in heterogeneous catalysis is leaching, a form of deactivation where active species on the surface of a solid catalyst are lost in the liquid phase. Leaching is detrimental for environmental and commercial reasons, and must be taken into consideration if a catalyst is to be used for extended periods of time. If the binding interactions between a catalyst and its support are too weak, leaching will be exacerbated, and its activity will decrease after extended use. For electrophilic catalysts, leaching may be addressed by choosing a more basic support. As this strategy may negatively affect the activity of the catalyst, a subtle balance between leaching mitigation and activity is required.

=== Strong metal-support interaction ===
Strong metal-support interaction is another case highlighting the oversimplification that heterogeneous catalysts are merely supported on an inert substance. The original evidence was provided by the finding that particles of platinum bind H_{2} with the stoichiometry PtH_{2} for each surface atom regardless of whether the platinum is supported or not. When, however, supported on titanium dioxide, Pt no longer binds with H_{2} with the same stoichiometry. This difference is attributed to the electronic influence of the titania on the platinum, otherwise called strong metal-support interaction.

=== Heterogenized molecular catalysis ===
Molecular catalysts, consisting of transition metal complexes, have been immobilized on catalyst supports. The resulting material in principle combines features of both homogeneous catalysts – well defined metal complex structures – with the advantages of heterogeneous catalysts – recoverability and ease of handling. Many modalities have been developed for attaching metal complex catalysts to a support. However, the technique has not proven commercially viable, usually because the heterogenized transition metal complexes are leached from, or deactivated by, the support.

== Supports for electrocatalysis ==
Supports are used to give mechanical stability to catalyst nanoparticles or powders. Supports immobilize the particle reducing its mobility and favouring the chemical stabilization: they can be considered as solid capping agents. Supports also allow the nanoparticles to be easily recycled.

One of the most promising supports is graphene for its porosity, electronic properties, thermal stability and active surface area.

== Examples ==
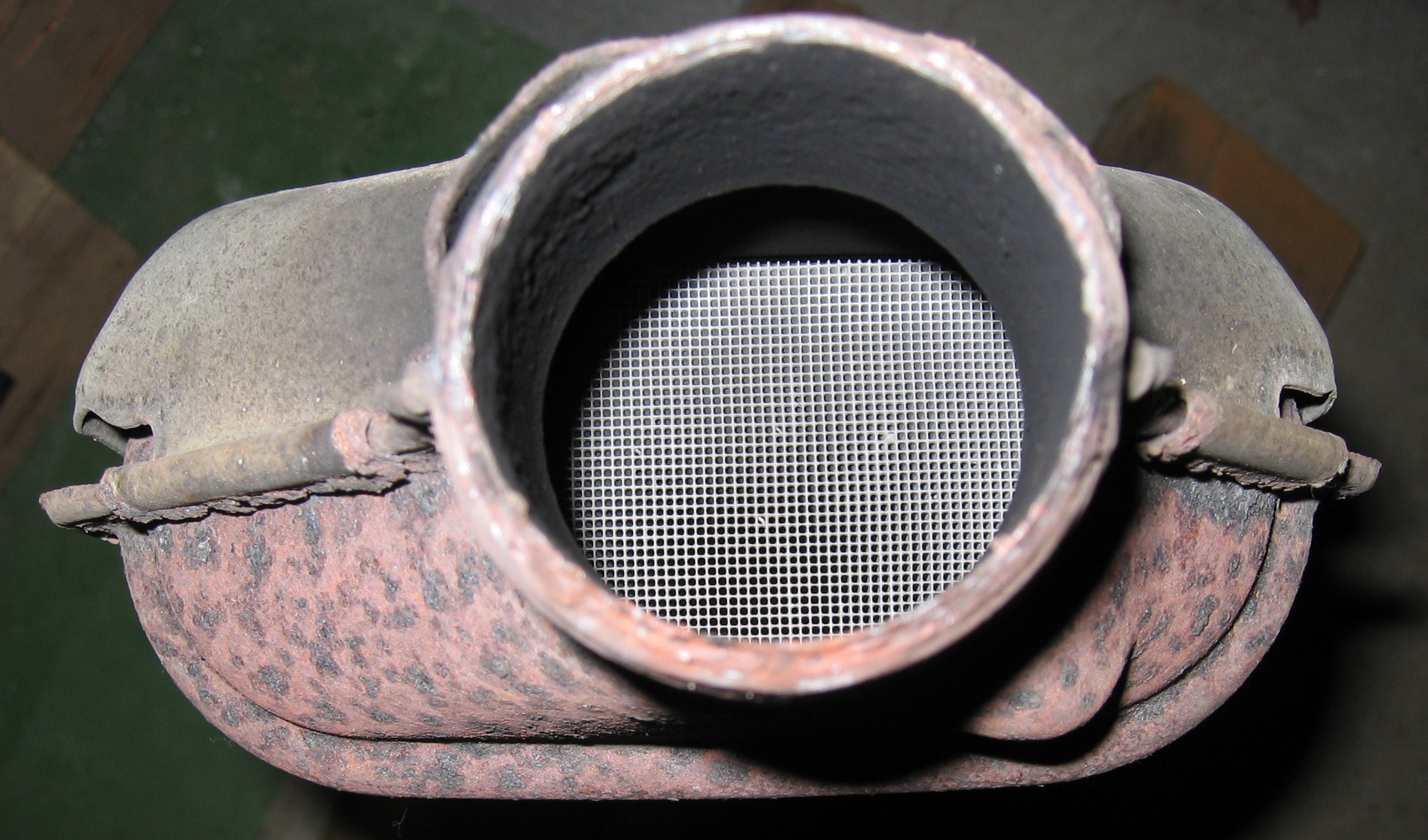
Ceramic-core converter of the type found in many automotive catalytic converters.

Almost all major heterogeneous catalysts are supported as illustrated in the table hereafter.

Process	Reactants, product(s)	Catalyst	Support
Ammonia synthesis (Haber–Bosch process)	N_{2} + H_{2}, NH_{3}	iron oxides	alumina
Hydrogen production by Steam reforming	CH_{4} + H_{2}O, H_{2} + CO	nickel	K_{2}O
Ethylene oxide synthesis	C_{2}H_{4} + O_{2}, C_{2}H_{4}O	silver with many promoters	alumina
Ziegler–Natta polymerization of ethylene	propylene, polypropylene; ethylene, polyethylene	TiCl_{3}	MgCl_{2}
Desulfurization of petroleum (hydrodesulfurization)	H_{2} + organosulfur compounds, RH + H_{2}S	Mo-Co	alumina

== See also ==
- Fluidized bed reactor – Chemical reactor
