= Low-density polyethylene =

Chemical compound

The branched structure of LDPE

Low-density polyethylene (LDPE) is one of several varieties of polyethylene (PE). PEs, the dominant synthetic polymer, are produced in many forms that differ in terms of molecular weight, branching, and the incorporation of comonomers. Often these features are captured in terms of the density of the material. All forms of PE are colorless, odorless, rather chemically inert solids produced by the polymerization of ethylene, the monomer. LLDPE is a substantially linear polymer (polyethylene), with significant numbers of short branches. In 2013 the worldwide LDPE market reached a volume of about US$33 billion. A variety of LDPEs are known, which mainly differ by the degree of linearity vs branching.

LDPE can be further classified: LDPE and linear low-density PE. The former is produced by free-radical polymerization and the latter by coordination polymerization (e.g. Ziegler-Natta catalysis).

== Properties ==
LDPE is a thermoplastic. PEs are often classified by their densities.

Polyethylene (PE) densities and structure
| PE type | density (g/cm^{3}) | structure |
|---|---|---|
| LDPE | 0.924 | highly branch, some cross-links |
| LLDPE | 0.922 | some short branches |
| HDPE | 0.961 | no branching |

LDPE has more branching (on about 2% of the carbon atoms) than HDPE, so its intermolecular forces (instantaneous-dipole induced-dipole attraction) are weaker, its tensile strength is lower, and its resilience is higher. The side branches mean that its molecules are less tightly packed and less crystalline, and therefore its density is lower.

=== Chemical resistance ===
At room temperature it is not reactive, except to strong oxidizers; some solvents cause it to swell. It can withstand temperatures of 65 °C (149 °F) continuously and 90 °C (194 °F) for a short time. Made in translucent and opaque variations, it is quite flexible and tough.

- Excellent resistance (no attack/no chemical reaction) to dilute and concentrated acids, alcohols, bases, and esters
- Good resistance (minor attack/very low chemical reactivity) to aldehydes, ketones, and vegetable oils
- Limited resistance (moderate attack/significant chemical reaction, suitable for short-term use only) to aliphatic and aromatic hydrocarbons, mineral oils, and oxidizing agents
- Poor resistance, and not recommended for use with halogenated hydrocarbons.

== Applications ==
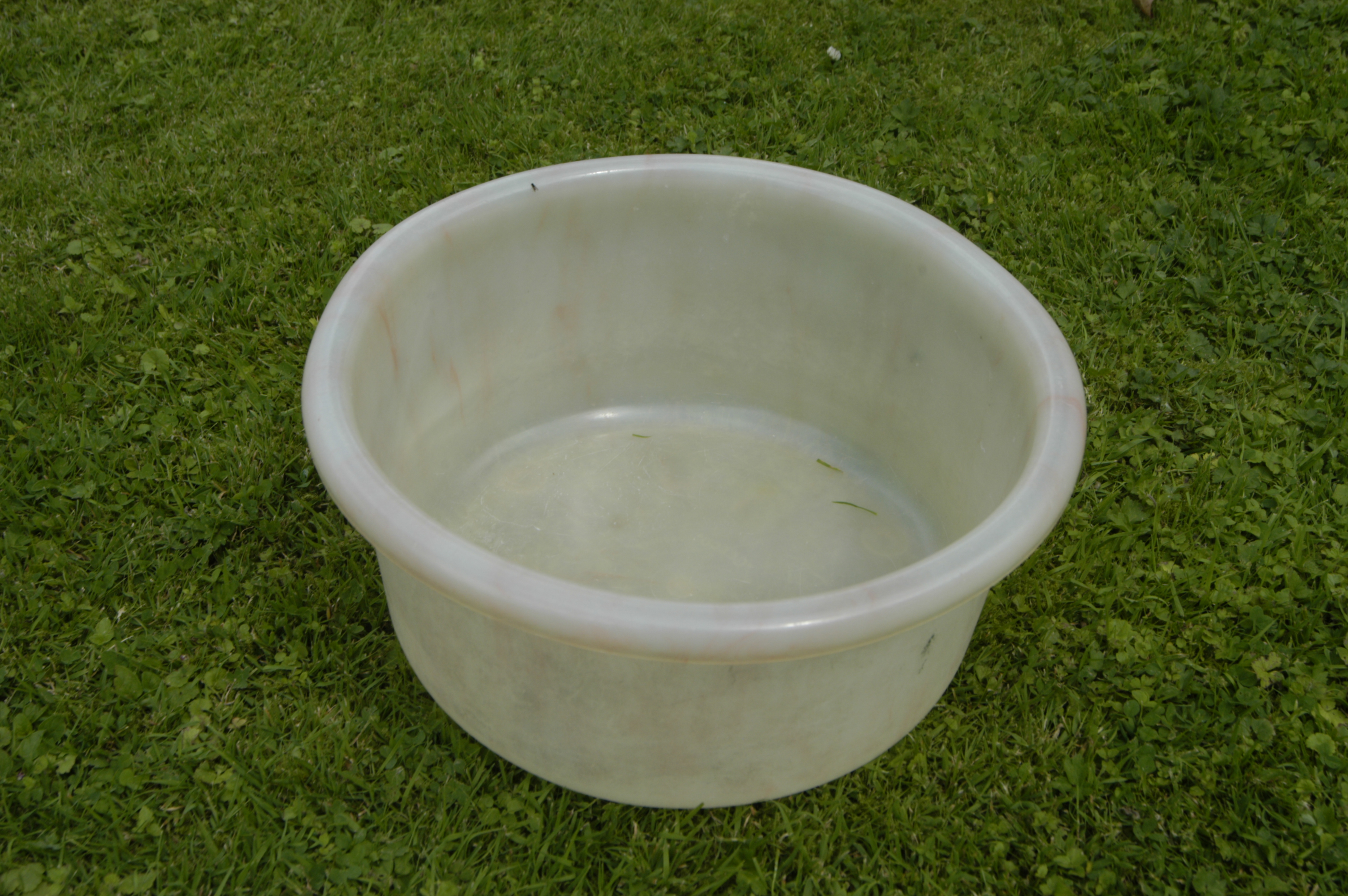
A GEECO bowl, c. 1950, still used in 2014

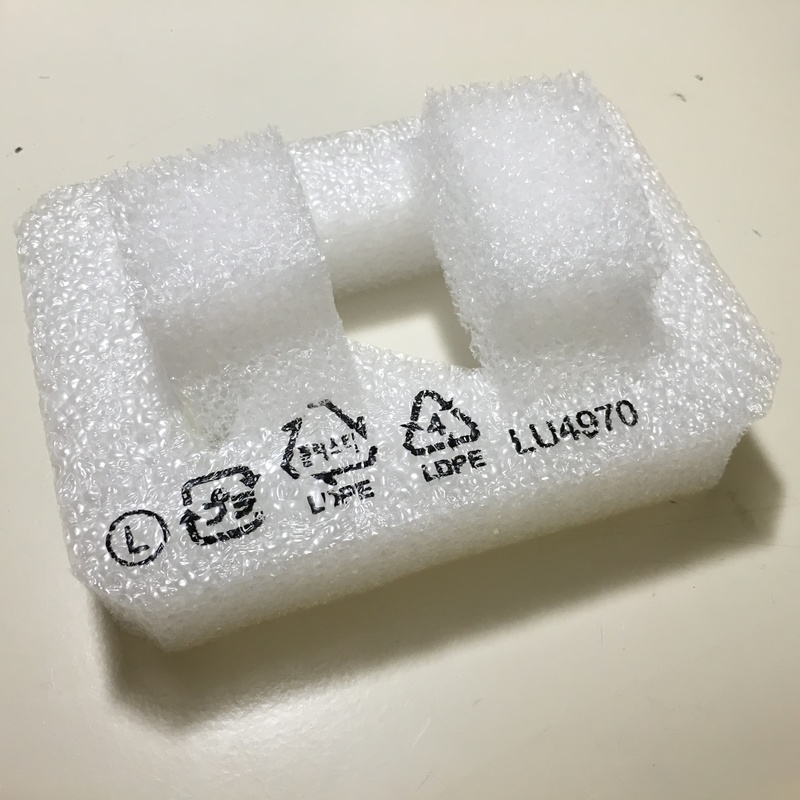
A piece of packaging foam made from LDPE

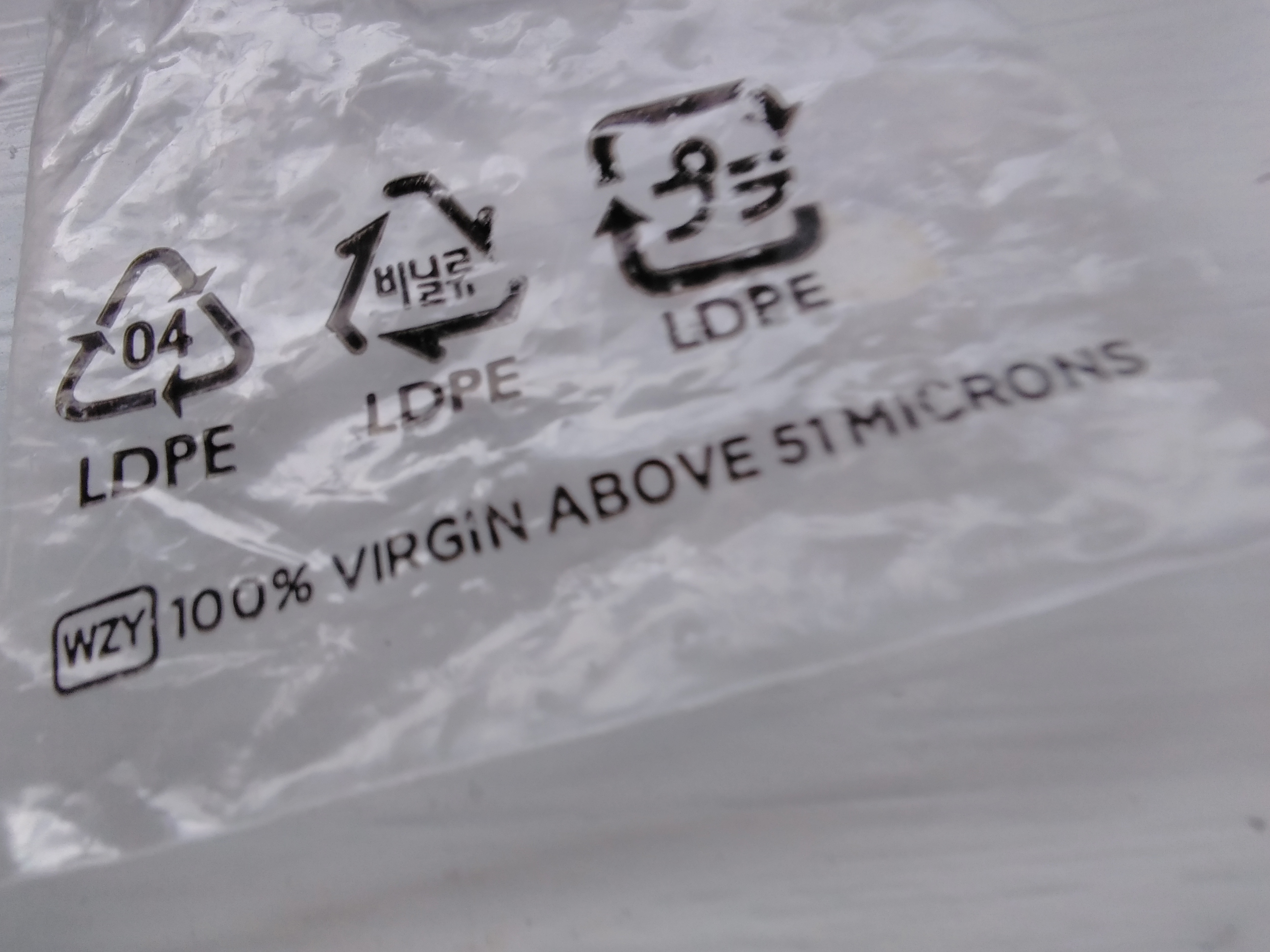
A Ziploc bag made from LDPE

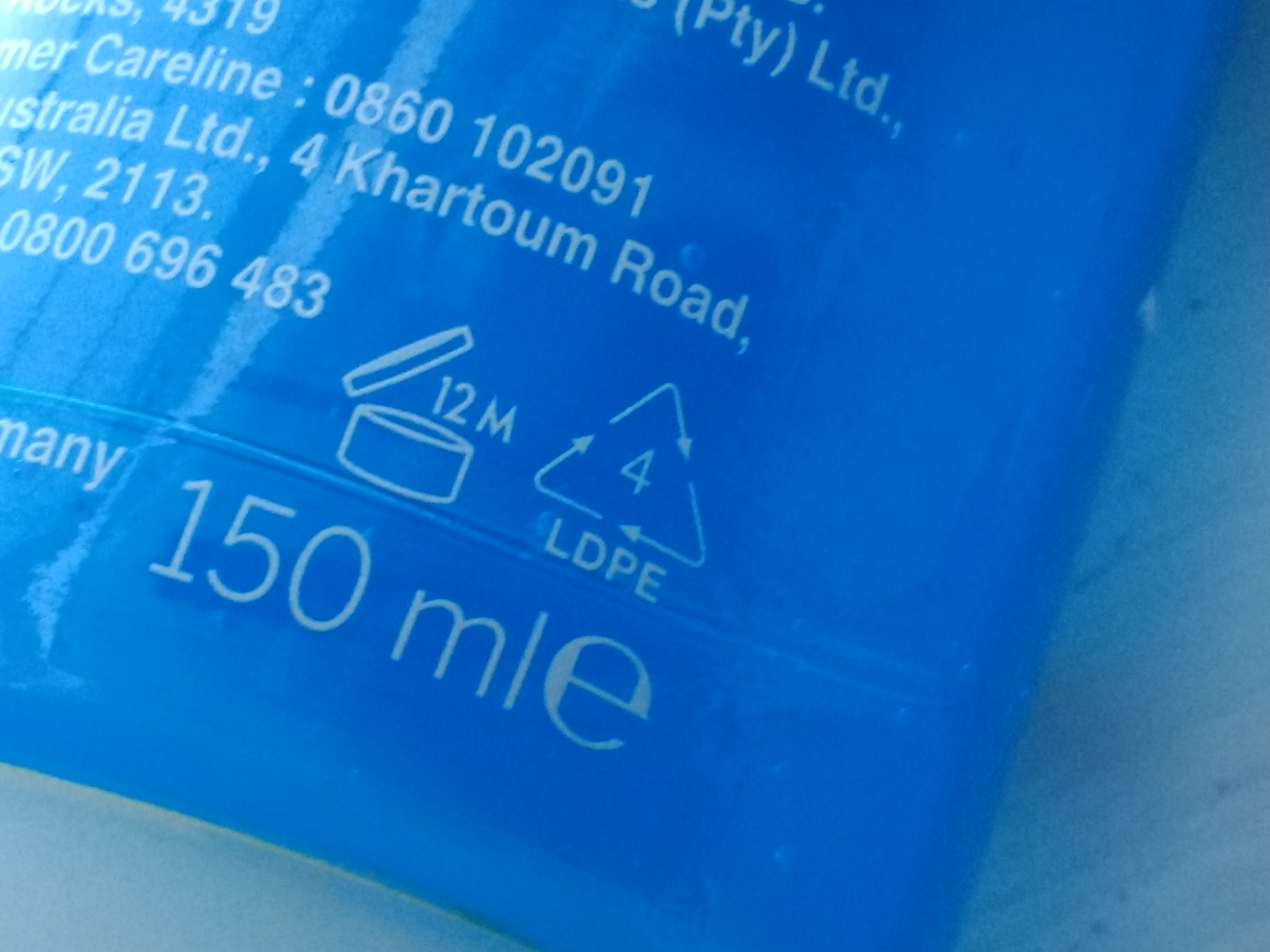
Facial wash gel bottle made of LDPE

Polyolefins (LDPE, HDPE, PP) are a major type of thermoplastic. LDPE is widely used for manufacturing various containers, dispensing bottles, wash bottles, tubing, plastic parts for computer components, and various molded laboratory equipment. Its most common use is in plastic bags. Other products made from it include:

- Trays and general purpose containers
- Corrosion-resistant work surfaces
- Parts that need to be weldable and machinable
- Parts that require flexibility, for which it serves very well
- Very soft and pliable parts such as snap-on lids
- Six-pack rings
- Juice and milk cartons are made of liquid packaging board, a laminate of paperboard and LDPE (as the waterproof inner and outer layer), and often with of a layer of aluminum foil (thus becoming aseptic packaging).
- Packaging for computer hardware, such as hard disk drives, screen cards, and optical disc drives
- Playground slides
- Plastic wraps
- Plastic bags
- Plastic containers
- Pipes
- Housewares
- Battery cases
- Automotive parts
- Electrical components

== History ==
LDPE was the first grade of polyethylene. It was discovered by John C Swallow and M.W Perrin at Imperial Chemical Industries (ICI) using a high pressure process and free radical polymerization. Major innovations were made in the 1950 by commercial, governmental, and university labs, focusing especially on catalysts, which allowed the production of PE without free radicals. Some of this work led to the Nobel Prize in Chemistry.

== Recycling ==
LDPE has SPI resin ID code 4

The EPA estimates 5.7% of LDPE (resin identification code 4) is recycled in the United States. Despite its designation with the recycling symbol, it cannot be as commonly recycled as No. 1 (polyethylene terephthalate) or 2 plastics (high-density polyethylene).

== See also ==
- Film blowing machine
- High-density polyethylene (HDPE)
- Linear low-density polyethylene (LLDPE)
- Medium-density polyethylene (MDPE)
- Polyethylene terephthalate (PET/PETE)
- Stretch wrap
- Ultra-high-molecular-weight polyethylene (UHMWPE)
