= Cossee–Arlman mechanism =

Chemical mechanism that makes C-C bonds

The Cossee–Arlman mechanism in polymer chemistry is the main pathway for the formation of C–C bonds in the polymerization of alkenes. The mechanism features an intermediate coordination complex that contains both the growing polymer chain and the monomer (alkene). These ligands combine within the coordination sphere of the metal to form a polymer chain that is elongated by two carbons.

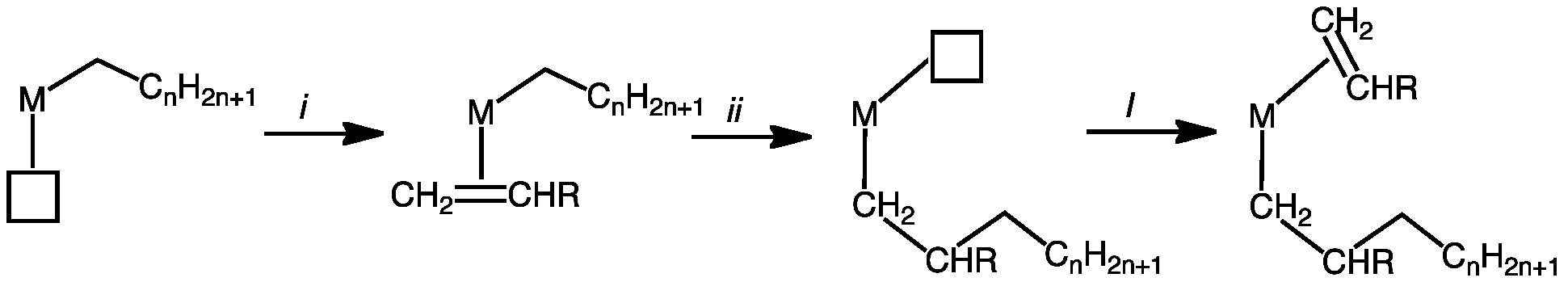
The box represents a vacant (or extremely labile) coordination site. Step i involves binding of the monomer to the metal and step ii involves the migratory insertion step. These steps, which alternate from one side of the metal center to the other, are repeated many times for each polymer chain.

The details of this mechanism can be used to explain the stereoregularity of the polymerisation of alkenes using Ziegler–Natta or metallocene catalysts. Stereoregularity is relevant for unsymmetrical alkenes such as propylene. The coordination sphere of the metal ligands sterically influences which end of the propylene attaches to the growing polymer chain and the relative stereochemistry of the methyl groups on the polymer. The stereoregularity is influenced by the ligands. For the metallocene catalysts, the cyclopentadienyl ligands (or their surrogates) fulfill this role. For heterogeneous catalysts, the stereoregularity is determined by the surface structure around the active site on the catalyst particle, and can be influenced by additives such as succinates or phthalates, which tend to block specific sites, while leaving others (with different stereoreactivity) to catalyse the polymerization.

== Publications of historic interest ==
- Allegra G. (1971). "Discussion on the Mechanism of Polymerization of a- Olefins with Ziegler–Natta Catalysts". Die Makromolekulare Chemie. 145 (3668): 235–246. doi:10.1002/macp.1971.021450119.
- Cossee, P. J. (1964). "Ziegler–Natta catalysis I. Mechanism of polymerization of α-olefins with Ziegler–Natta catalysts". J. Catal. 3 (1): 80–89. doi:10.1016/0021-9517(64)90095-8.
- Arlman, E. J. (1964). "Ziegler–Natta catalysis II. Surface structure of layer-lattice transition metal chlorides". J. Catal. 3 (1): 89–99. doi:10.1016/0021-9517(64)90096-X.
- Arlman, E. J.; Cossee, P. (1964). "Ziegler–Natta catalysis III. Stereospecific polymerization of propene with the catalyst system TiCl_{3}---AlEt_{3}". J. Catal. 3 (1): 99–104. doi:10.1016/0021-9517(64)90097-1.
