= Phillips catalyst =

Ethylene polymerization catalyst

Structure proposed for the Phillips precatalyst.

The Phillips catalyst, or the Phillips supported chromium catalyst, is the catalyst used to produce approximately half of the world's polyethylene. A heterogeneous catalyst, it consists of a chromium oxide supported on silica gel. Polyethylene, the most-produced synthetic polymer, is produced industrially by the polymerization of ethylene:

n C_{2}H_{4} → (C_{2}H_{4})_{n}

Although exergonic (i.e., thermodynamically favorable), the reaction requires catalysts. Three main catalysts are employed commercially: the Phillips catalyst, Ziegler–Natta catalysts (based on titanium trichloride), and, for specialty polymers, metallocene-based catalysts.

== Preparation and mechanism of action ==
The Phillips catalyst is prepared by impregnating high surface area silica gel with chromium trioxide or related chromium compounds. The solid precatalyst is then calcined in air to give the active catalyst. Only a fraction of the chromium is catalytically active, a fact that interferes with elucidation of the catalytic mechanism. The active catalyst is often depicted as a chromate ester bound to the silica surface. The mechanism for the polymerization process is the subject of much research, the central question being the structure of the active species, which is assumed to be an organochromium compound. Robert L. Banks and J. Paul Hogan, both at Phillips Petroleum, filed the first patents on the Phillips catalyst in 1953. Four years later, the process was commercialized.
