= Polypropylene =

Thermoplastic polymer

Polypropylene (PP)

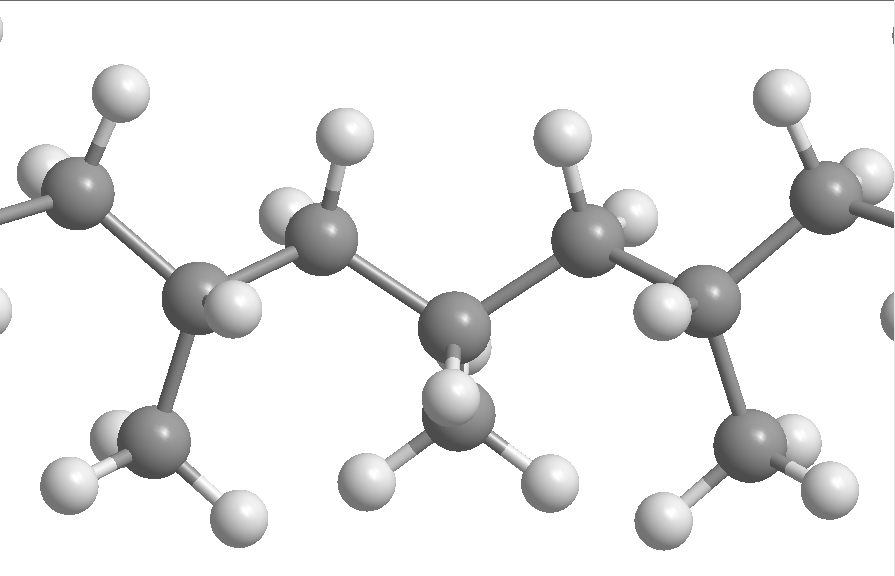
- Polypropylene isotactic

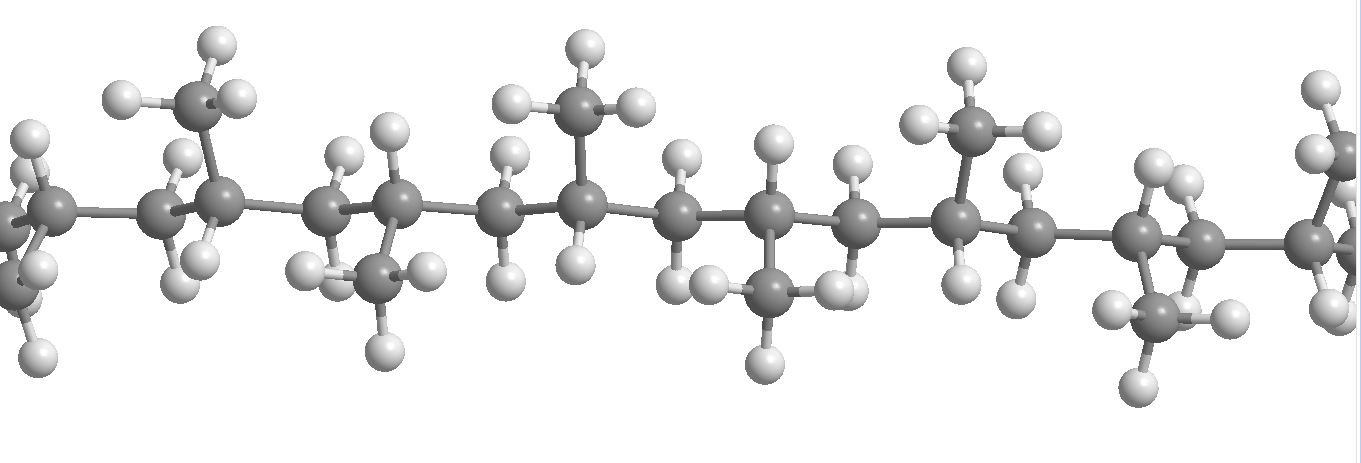
- Polypropylene syndiotactic Pp

Names
- IUPAC name Poly(1-methylethylene)
- Other names Polypropylene; Polypropene; Polipropene 25 [USAN]; Propene polymers; Propylene polymers; 1-Propene; [-Ch2-Ch(Ch3)-]n

Identifiers
CAS Number	9003-07-0
ChemSpider	N
ECHA InfoCard	100.117.813
UNII	1ASA949VIC
CompTox Dashboard (EPA)	DTXSID00872805

Properties
Chemical formula	is (C_{3}H_{6})_{n}
Density	0.8550 g/cm^{3}, amorphous 0.946 g/cm^{3}, crystalline
Melting point	130 to 171 °C (266 to 340 °F; 403 to 444 K)
- Except where otherwise noted, data are given for materials in their standard state (at 25 °C [77 °F], 100 kPa). verify (what is ?) Infobox references

Polypropylene (PP), also known as polypropene, is a thermoplastic polymer used in a wide variety of applications. It is produced via chain-growth polymerization from the monomer propylene.

Polypropylene belongs to the group of polyolefins and is partially crystalline and non-polar. Its properties are similar to polyethylene, but it is slightly harder and more heat-resistant. It is a white, mechanically rugged material and has a high chemical resistance.

Polypropylene is the second-most widely produced commodity plastic (after polyethylene).

== History ==
Phillips Petroleum chemists J. Paul Hogan and Robert Banks first demonstrated the polymerization of propylene in 1951. The stereoselective polymerization to the isotactic was discovered by Giulio Natta and Karl Rehn in March 1954. This pioneering discovery led to large-scale commercial production of isotactic polypropylene by the Italian firm Montecatini from 1957 onwards. Syndiotactic polypropylene was also first synthesized by Natta. Interest in polypropylene development is ongoing to the present. For example, making polypropylene from bio-based resources is a topic of interest in the 21st century.

== Chemical and physical properties ==
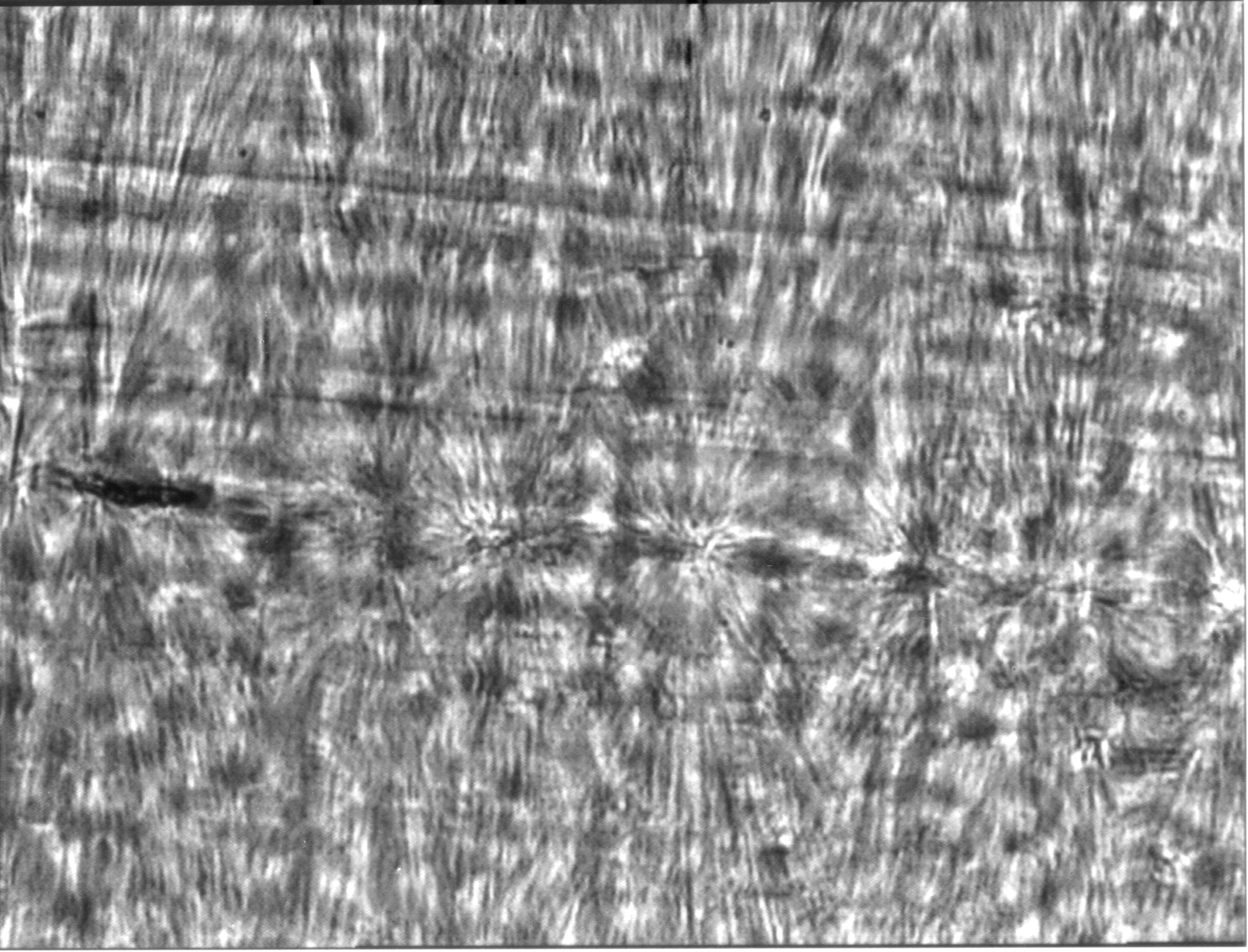
Micrograph of polypropylene

Polypropylene is, in small aspects, similar to polyethylene, especially in solution behavior and electrical properties. The methyl group improves mechanical properties and thermal resistance, although the chemical resistance decreases. The properties of polypropylene depend on the molecular weight and molecular weight distribution, crystallinity, type and proportion of comonomer (if used) and the isotacticity. In isotactic polypropylene, for example, the methyl groups are oriented on one side of the carbon backbone. This arrangement creates a greater degree of crystallinity and results in a stiffer material that is more resistant to creep than both atactic polypropylene and polyethylene.

=== Mechanical properties ===
The density of PP is between 0.895 and 0.93 g/cm^{3}. Therefore, PP is the commodity plastic with the lowest density. With lower density, moldings parts with lower weight and more parts of a certain mass of plastic can be produced. Unlike polyethylene, crystalline and amorphous regions differ only slightly in their density. However, the density of polyethylene can significantly change with fillers.

The Young's modulus of PP is between 1300 and 1800 N/mm².

Polypropylene is normally tough and flexible, especially when copolymerized with ethylene. This allows polypropylene to be used as an engineering plastic, competing with materials such as acrylonitrile butadiene styrene (ABS). Polypropylene is reasonably economical.

Polypropylene has good resistance to fatigue.

=== Thermal properties ===
The melting point of polypropylene occurs in a range, so the melting point is determined by finding the highest temperature of a differential scanning calorimetry chart. Perfectly isotactic PP has a melting point of 171 °C (340 °F). Commercial isotactic PP has a melting point that ranges from 160 to 166 °C (320 to 331 °F), depending on atactic material and crystallinity. Syndiotactic PP with a crystallinity of 30% has a melting point of 130 °C (266 °F). Below 0 °C, PP becomes brittle.

The thermal expansion of PP is significant, but somewhat less than that of polyethylene.

=== Chemical properties ===
Propylene molecules prefer to join together "head-to-tail", giving a chain with methyl groups on every other carbon, but some randomness occurs. Polypropylene at room temperature is resistant to fats and almost all organic solvents, apart from strong oxidants. Non-oxidizing acids and bases can be stored in containers made of PP. At elevated temperature, PP can be dissolved in nonpolar solvents such as xylene, tetralin and decalin. Due to the tertiary carbon atom, PP is chemically less resistant than PE (see Markovnikov rule).

Most commercial polypropylene is isotactic and has an intermediate level of crystallinity between that of low-density polyethylene (LDPE) and high-density polyethylene (HDPE). Isotactic & atactic polypropylene is soluble in p-xylene at 140 °C. Isotactic precipitates when the solution is cooled to 25 °C and atactic portion remains soluble in p-xylene.

The melt flow rate (MFR) or melt flow index (MFI) is a measure of molecular weight of polypropylene. The measure helps to determine how easily the molten raw material will flow during processing. Polypropylene with higher MFR will fill the plastic mold more easily during the injection or blow-molding production process. As the melt flow increases, however, some physical properties, like impact strength, will decrease.

There are three general types of polypropylene: homopolymer, random copolymer, and block copolymer. The comonomer is typically used with ethylene. Ethylene-propylene rubber or EPDM added to polypropylene homopolymer increases its low temperature impact strength. Randomly polymerized ethylene monomer added to polypropylene homopolymer decreases the polymer crystallinity, lowers the melting point and makes the polymer more transparent.

==== Molecular structure – tacticity ====

Polypropylene can be categorized as atactic polypropylene (aPP), syndiotactic polypropylene (sPP) and isotactic polypropylene (iPP). In case of atactic polypropylene, the methyl group (-CH_{3}) is randomly aligned, alternating (alternating) for syndiotactic polypropylene and evenly for isotactic polypropylene. This has an impact on the crystallinity (amorphous or semi-crystalline) and the thermal properties (expressed as glass transition point T_{g} and melting point T_{m}).

The term tacticity describes for polypropylene how the methyl group is oriented in the polymer chain. Commercial polypropylene is usually isotactic. This article therefore always refers to isotactic polypropylene, unless stated otherwise. The tacticity is usually indicated in percent, using the isotactic index (according to DIN 16774). The index is measured by determining the fraction of the polymer insoluble in boiling heptane. Commercially available polypropylenes usually have an isotactic index between 85 and 95%. The tacticity affects the polymer's physical properties. As the methyl group is in isotactic propylene consistently located at the same side, it forces the macromolecule in a helical shape, as also found in starch. An isotactic structure leads to a semi-crystalline polymer. The higher the isotonicity(the isotactic fraction), the greater the crystallinity, and thus also the softening point, rigidity, e-modulus and hardness.

Atactic polypropylene, on the other hand, lacks any regularity, which prevents it from crystallization, thereby creating an amorphous material.

==== Crystal structure of polypropylene ====
Isotactic polypropylene has a high degree of crystallinity, in industrial products 30–60%. Syndiotactic polypropylene is slightly less crystalline, atactic PP is amorphous (not crystalline).

===== Isotactic polypropylene (iPP) =====
Is polypropylene can exist in various crystalline modifications which differ by the molecular arrangement of the polymer chains. The crystalline modifications are categorized into the α-, β- and γ-modification as well as mesomorphic (smectic) forms. The α-modifications is predominant in iPP. Such crystals are built from lamellae in the form of folded chains. A characteristic anomaly is that the lame are arranged in the so-called "cross-hatched" structure. The melting point of α-crystalline regions is given as 185 to 220 °C, the density as 0.936 to 0.946 g·cm^{−3}. The β-modification is in comparison somewhat less ordered, as a result of which it forms faster and has a lower melting point of 170 to 200 °C. The formation of the β-modification can be promoted by nucleating agents, suitable temperatures and shear stress. The γ-modification is hardly formed under the conditions used in industry and is poorly understood. The mesomorphic modification, however, occurs often in industrial processing, since the plastic is usually cooled quickly. The degree of order of the mesomorphic phase ranges between the crystalline and the amorphous phase, its density is with 0.916 g·cm^{−3} comparatively. The mesomorphic phase is considered as cause for the transparency in rapidly cooled films (due to low order and small crystallites).

===== Syndiotactic polypropylene (sPP) =====
Syndiotactic polypropylene was discovered much later than isotactic PP and could only be prepared by using metallocene catalysts. Syndiotactic PP has a lower melting point, with 161 to 186 °C, depending on the degree of tacticity.

===== Atactic polypropylene (aPP) =====
Atactic polypropylene is amorphous and has therefore no crystal structure. Due to its lack of crystallinity, it is readily soluble even at moderate temperatures, which allows to separate it as by-product from isotactic polypropylene by extraction. However, the aPP obtained this way is not completely amorphous but can still contain 15% crystalline parts. Atactic polypropylene can also be produced selectively using metallocene catalysts, atactic polypropylene produced this way has a considerably higher molecular weight. Atactic polypropylene has lower density, melting point and softening temperature than the crystalline types and is tacky and rubber-like at room temperature. It is a colorless, cloudy material and can be used between −15 and +120 °C. Atactic polypropylene is used as a sealant, as an insulating material for automobiles and as an additive to bitumen.

==== Copolymers ====
Polypropylene copolymers are in use as well. A particularly important one is polypropylene random copolymer (PPR or PP-R), a random copolymer with polyethylene used for plastic pipework.

==== PP-RCT ====
Polypropylene random crystallinity temperature (PP-RCT), also used for plastic pipework, is a new form of this plastic. It achieves higher strength at high temperature by β-crystallization.

==== Degradation ====
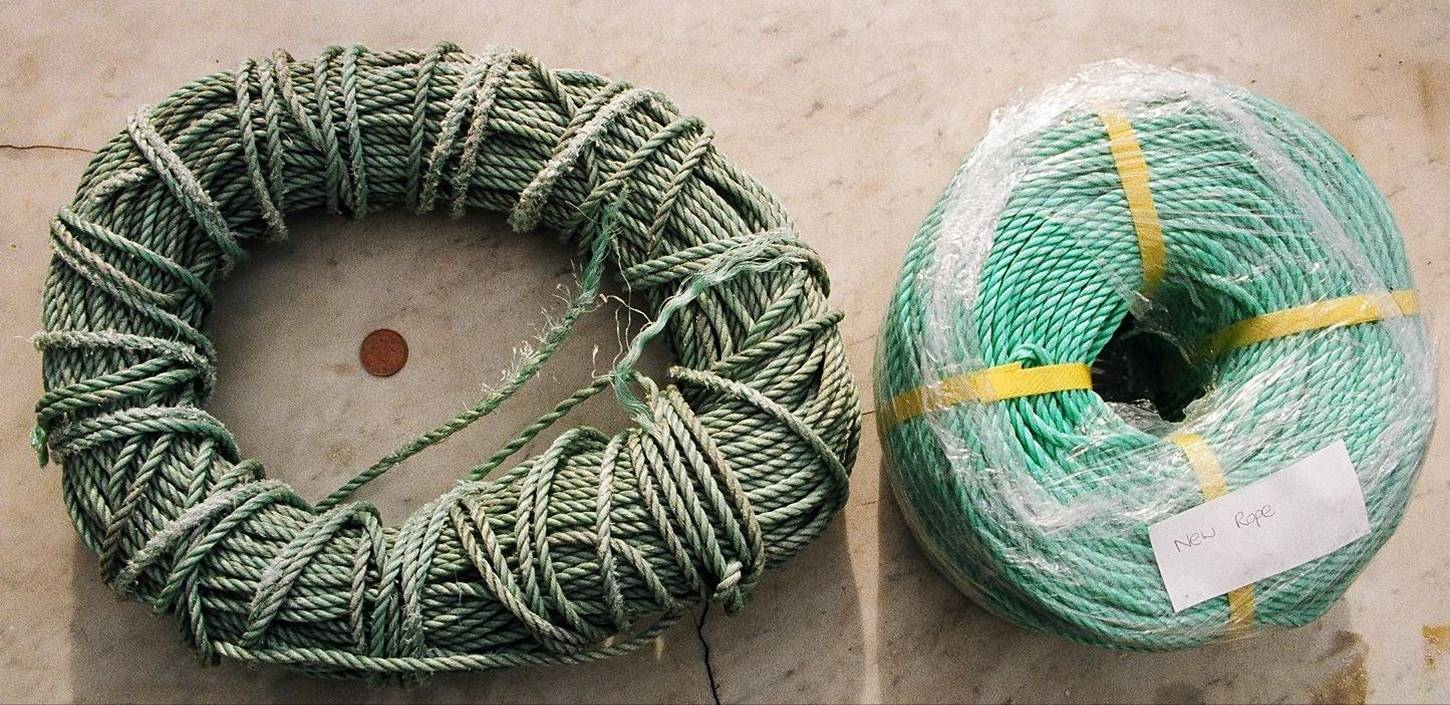
Effect of UV exposure on polypropylene rope

Polypropylene is liable to chain degradation from exposure to temperatures above 100 °C. Oxidation usually occurs at the tertiary carbon centers leading to chain breaking via reaction with oxygen. In external applications, degradation is evidenced by cracks and crazing. It may be protected by the use of various polymer stabilizers, including UV-absorbing additives and anti-oxidants such as phosphites (e.g. tris(2,4-di-tert-butylphenyl)phosphite) and hindered phenols, which prevent polymer degradation. Microbial communities isolated from soil samples mixed with starch have been shown to be capable of degrading polypropylene. Polypropylene has been reported to degrade while in the human body as implantable mesh devices. The degraded material forms a tree bark-like layer at the surface of mesh fibers.

=== Optical properties ===
PP can be made translucent when uncolored but is not as readily made transparent as polystyrene, acrylic, or certain other plastics. It is often opaque or colored using pigments.

== Production ==
Polypropylene is produced by the chain-growth polymerization of propene:

The industrial production processes can be grouped into gas phase polymerization, bulk polymerization and slurry polymerization. All state-of-the-art processes use either gas-phase or bulk reactor systems.

- In gas-phase and slurry-reactors, the polymer is formed around heterogeneous catalyst particles. The gas-phase polymerization is carried out in a fluidized bed reactor, propene is passed over a bed containing the heterogeneous (solid) catalyst and the formed polymer is separated as a fine powder and then converted into pellets. Unreacted gas is recycled and fed back into the reactor.
- In bulk polymerization, liquid propene acts as a solvent to prevent the precipitation of the polymer. The polymerization proceeds at 60 to 80 °C and 30–40 atm are applied to keep the propene in the liquid state. For the bulk polymerization, typically loop reactors are applied. The bulk polymerization is limited to a maximum of 5% ethene as comonomer due to a limited solubility of the polymer in the liquid propene.
- In the slurry polymerization, typically C4–C6 alkanes (butane, pentane or hexane) are utilized as inert diluent to suspend the growing polymer particles. Propene is introduced into the mixture as a gas.

=== Catalysts ===
The properties of PP are strongly affected by its tacticity, i.e., the relative position (head-to-head vs head-to-tail, etc.) and orientation of the methyl groups (CH_{3}). The catalyst determines these two aspects.

Commercially available catalysts are of two types, heterogeneous and homogeneous.

Typical heterogeneous catalysts are prepared from TiCl_{4} as an active ingredient and MgCl_{2} as a catalyst support. Such catalysts also contain organic modifiers, either aromatic acid esters and diesters or ethers. These mixtures, which are not catalysts, are activated by reagents such organoaluminium compounds such as triethylaluminium (Al_{2}(C_{2}H_{5})_{6}). Commercial synthesis of isotactic polypropylene is usually carried out either in the medium of liquid propylene or in gas-phase reactors.

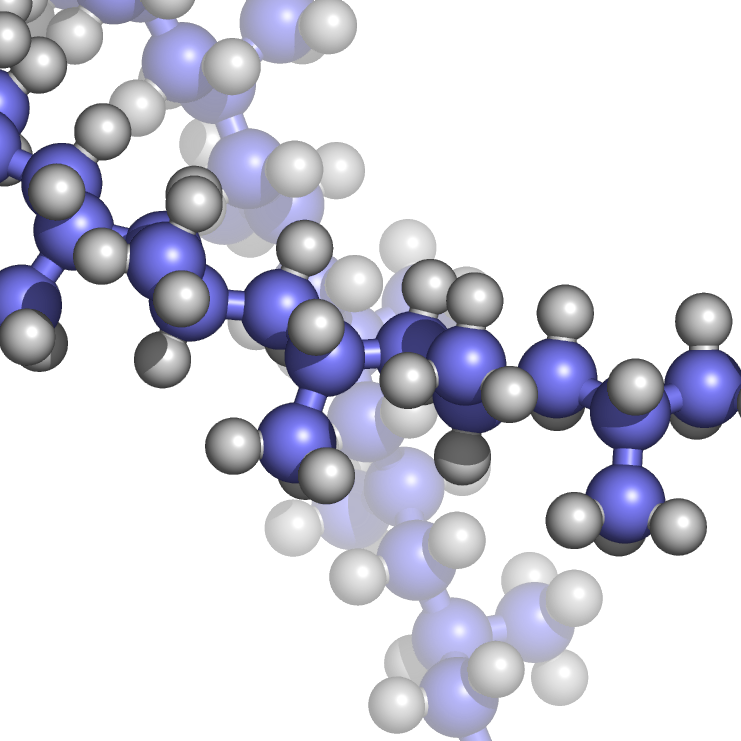
A ball-and-stick model of syndiotactic polypropylene

Commercial synthesis of syndiotactic polypropylene is carried out with the use of a special class of metallocene catalysts, illustrating the role of homogeneous catalysts. Like the heterogeneous catalysts, these catalysts are prepared by activation of a metal halide. Common precatalysts are modified versions of zirconacene dichloride. Modifications include linking the two cyclopentadienyl-like ligands with covalent groups such as Si(CH3)2 as well as replacing the cyclopentadienyl ligand with related groups such as indenyl and fluorenyl. These complexes are often activated with organoaluminium reagents such as methylaluminoxane (MAO).

== Manufacturing from polypropylene ==
Melting process of polypropylene can be achieved via extrusion and molding. Common extrusion methods include production of melt-blown and spun-bond fibers to form long rolls for future conversion into a wide range of useful products, such as face masks, filters, diapers and wipes.

The most common shaping technique is injection molding, which is used for parts such as cups, cutlery, vials, caps, containers, housewares, and automotive parts such as batteries. The related techniques of blow molding and injection-stretch blow molding are also used, which involve both extrusion and molding.

The large number of end-use applications for polypropylene are often possible because of the ability to tailor grades with specific molecular properties and additives during its manufacture. For example, antistatic additives can be added to help polypropylene surfaces resist dust and dirt. Many physical finishing techniques can also be used on polypropylene, such as machining. Surface treatments can be applied to polypropylene parts in order to promote adhesion of printing ink and paints.

Expanded Polypropylene (EPP) has been produced through both solid and melt state processing. EPP is manufactured using melt processing with either chemical or physical blowing agents. Expansion of PP in solid state, due to its highly crystalline structure, has not been successful. In this regard, two novel strategies were developed for expansion of PP. It was observed that PP can be expanded to make EPP through controlling its crystalline structure or through blending with other polymers.

=== Biaxially oriented polypropylene (BOPP) ===
When polypropylene film is extruded and stretched in both the machine direction and across machine direction it is called biaxially oriented polypropylene. Two methods are widely used for producing BOPP films, namely, a bi-directional stenter process or a double-bubble blown film extrusion process. Biaxial orientation increases strength and clarity. BOPP is widely used as a packaging material for packaging products such as snack foods, fresh produce and confectionery. It is easy to coat, print and laminate to give the required appearance and properties for use as a packaging material. This process is normally called converting. It is normally produced in large rolls which are slit on slitting machines into smaller rolls for use on packaging machines. BOPP is also used for stickers and labels in addition to OPP. It is non-reactive, which makes BOPP suitable for safe use in the pharmaceutical and food industry. It is one of the most important commercial polyolefin films. BOPP films are available in different thicknesses and widths. They are transparent and flexible.

== Applications ==
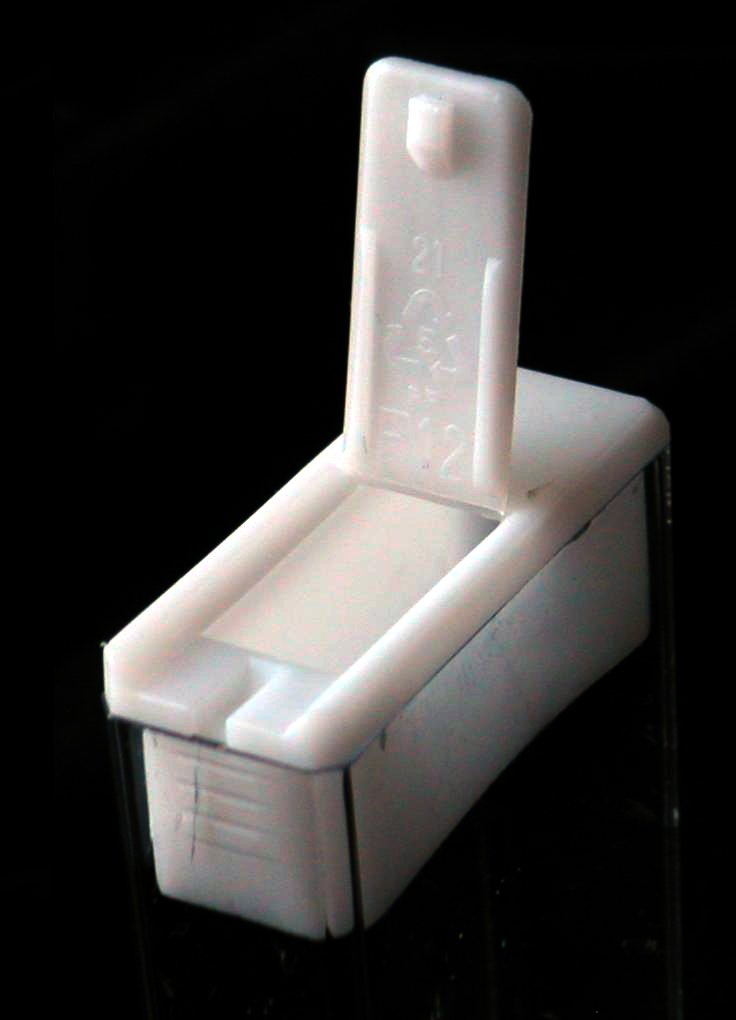
Polypropylene lid of a Tic Tac box, with a living hinge and the resin identification code under its flap

As polypropylene is resistant to fatigue, most plastic living hinges, such as those on flip-top bottles, are made from this material. However, it is important to ensure that chain molecules are oriented across the hinge to maximise strength.

Polypropylene is used in the manufacturing of piping systems, both ones concerned with high purity and ones designed for strength and rigidity (e.g., those intended for use in potable plumbing, hydronic heating and cooling, and reclaimed water). This material is often chosen for its resistance to corrosion and chemical leaching, its resilience against most forms of physical damage, including impact and freezing, its environmental benefits, and its ability to be joined by heat fusion rather than gluing.

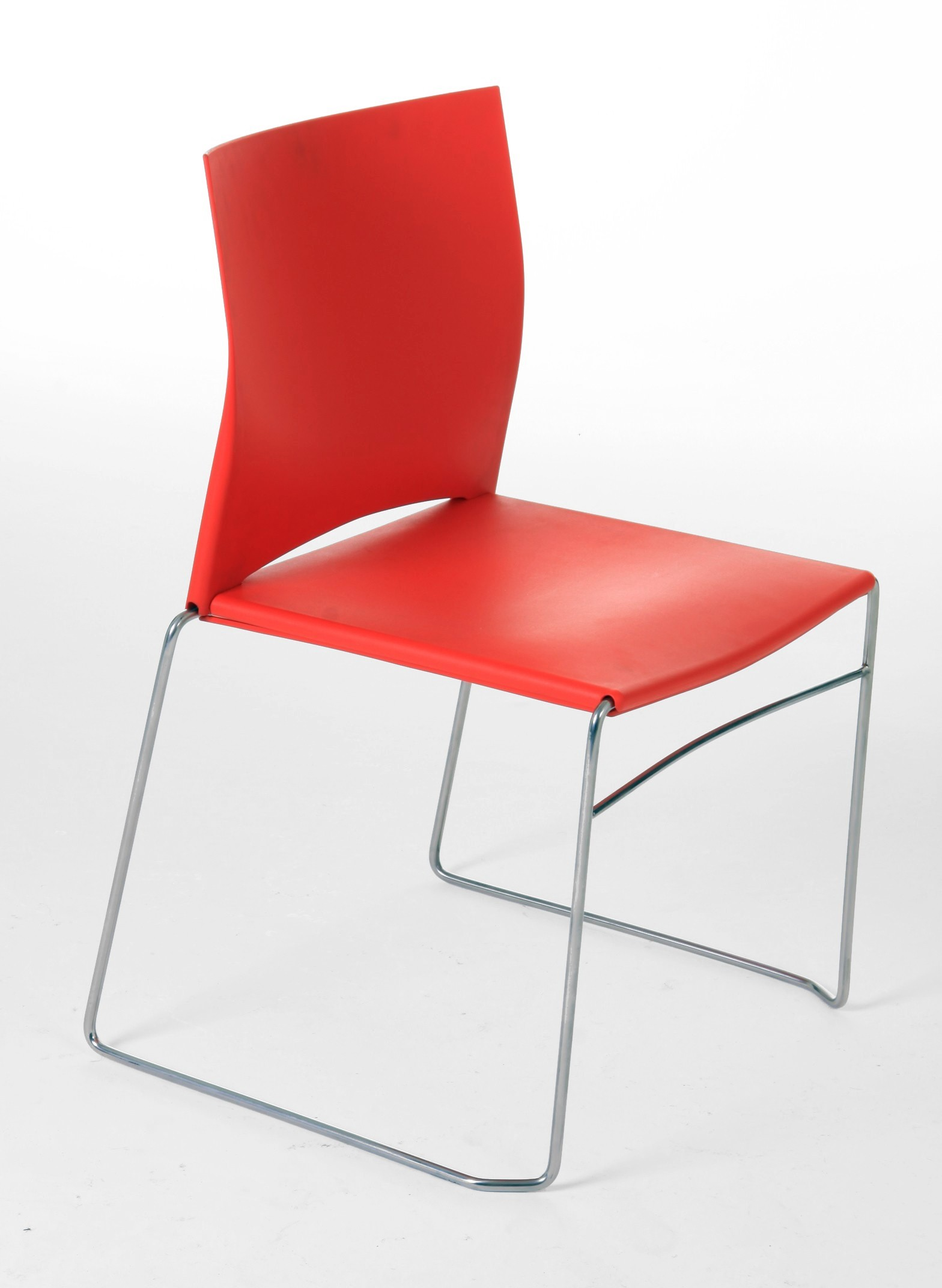
A chair with a polypropylene seat

Many plastic items for medical or laboratory use can be made from polypropylene because it can withstand the heat in an autoclave. Its heat resistance also enables it to be used as the manufacturing material of consumer-grade kettles. Food containers made from it will not melt in the dishwasher, and do not melt during industrial hot filling processes. For this reason, most plastic tubs for dairy products are polypropylene sealed with aluminum foil (both heat-resistant materials). After the product has cooled, the tubs are often given lids made of a less heat-resistant material, such as LDPE or polystyrene. Such containers provide a good hands-on example of the difference in modulus, since the rubbery (softer, more flexible) feeling of LDPE with respect to polypropylene of the same thickness is readily apparent. Rugged, translucent, reusable plastic containers made in a wide variety of shapes and sizes for consumers from various companies such as Rubbermaid and Sterilite are commonly made of polypropylene, although the lids are often made of somewhat more flexible LDPE so they can snap onto the container to close it. Polypropylene can also be made into disposable bottles to contain liquid, powdered, or similar consumer products, although HDPE and polyethylene terephthalate are commonly also used to make bottles. Plastic pails, car batteries, wastebaskets, pharmacy prescription bottles, cooler containers, dishes and pitchers are often made of polypropylene or HDPE, both of which commonly have rather similar appearance, feel, and properties at ambient temperature. An abundance of medical devices are made from PP.

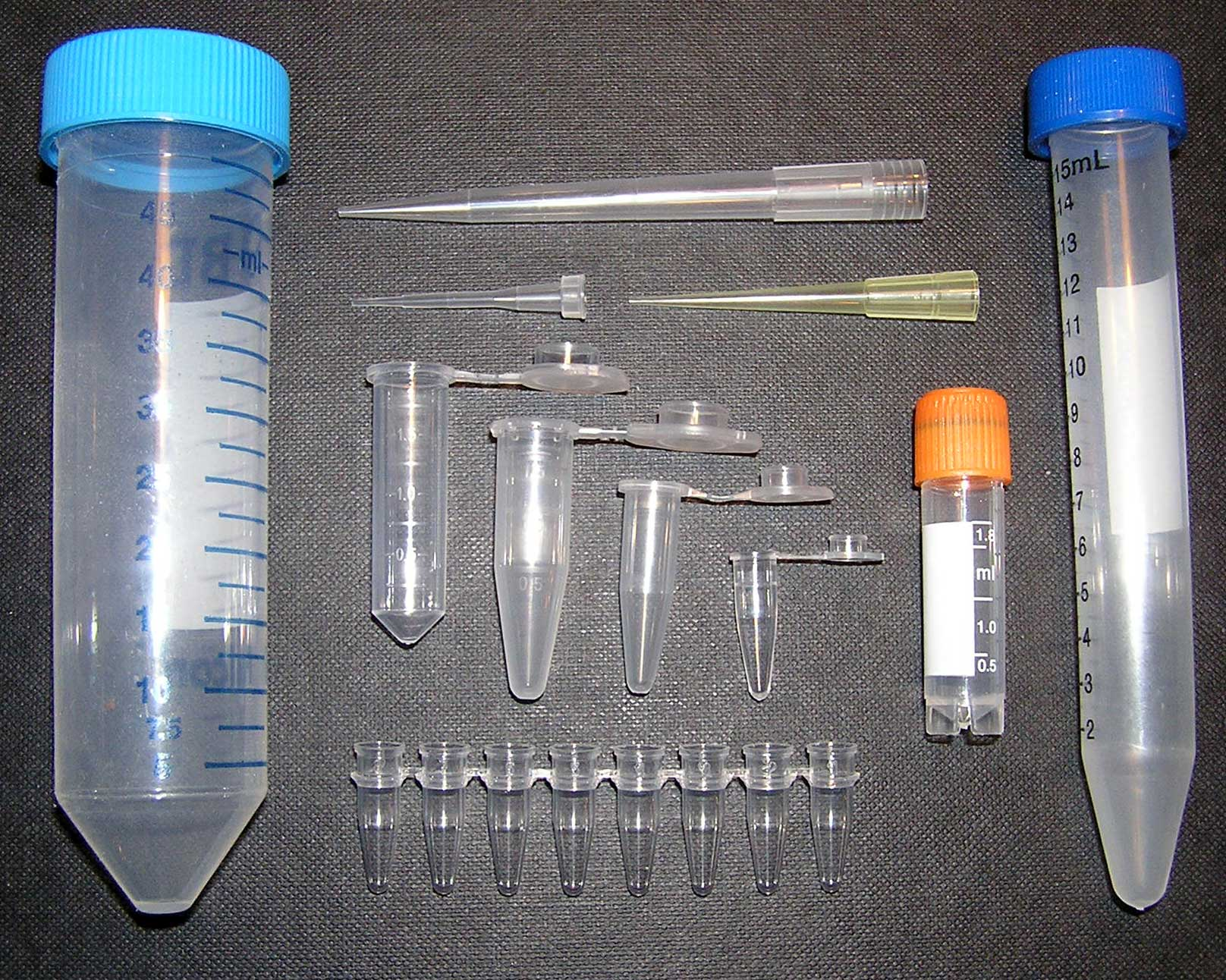
Polypropylene items for laboratory use. Blue and orange closures are not made of polypropylene.

A common application for polypropylene is as biaxially oriented polypropylene (BOPP). These BOPP sheets are used to make a wide variety of materials including clear bags. When polypropylene is biaxially oriented, it becomes crystal clear and serves as an excellent packaging material for artistic and retail products. Polypropylene, highly colorfast, is widely used in manufacturing carpets, rugs and mats to be used at home. Polypropylene is widely used in ropes, distinctive because they are light enough to float in water. For equal mass and construction, polypropylene rope is similar in strength to polyester rope. Polypropylene costs less than most other synthetic fibers. Polypropylene is also used as an alternative to polyvinyl chloride (PVC) as insulation for electrical cables for LSZH cable in low-ventilation environments, primarily tunnels. This is because it emits less smoke and no toxic halogens, which may lead to production of acid in high-temperature conditions. Polypropylene is also used in particular roofing membranes as the waterproofing top layer of single-ply systems as opposed to modified-bit systems. Polypropylene is most commonly used for plastic moldings, wherein it is injected into a mold while molten, forming complex shapes at relatively low cost and high volume; examples include bottle tops, bottles, and fittings.

It can also be produced in sheet form, widely used for the production of stationery folders, ring binder covers, packaging, and storage boxes. The wide color range, durability, low cost, and resistance to dirt make it ideal as a protective cover for papers and other materials. It is used in Rubik's Cube stickers because of these characteristics.

The availability of sheet polypropylene has provided an opportunity for the use of the material by designers. The light-weight, durable, and colorful plastic makes an ideal medium for the creation of lampshades, and a number of designs have been developed using interlocking sections to create elaborate designs.

Polypropylene fibres are used as a concrete additive to increase strength and reduce cracking and spalling. In some areas susceptible to earthquakes (e.g., California), PP fibers are added with soils to improve the soil's strength and damping when constructing the foundation of structures such as buildings, bridges, etc.

=== Clothing ===
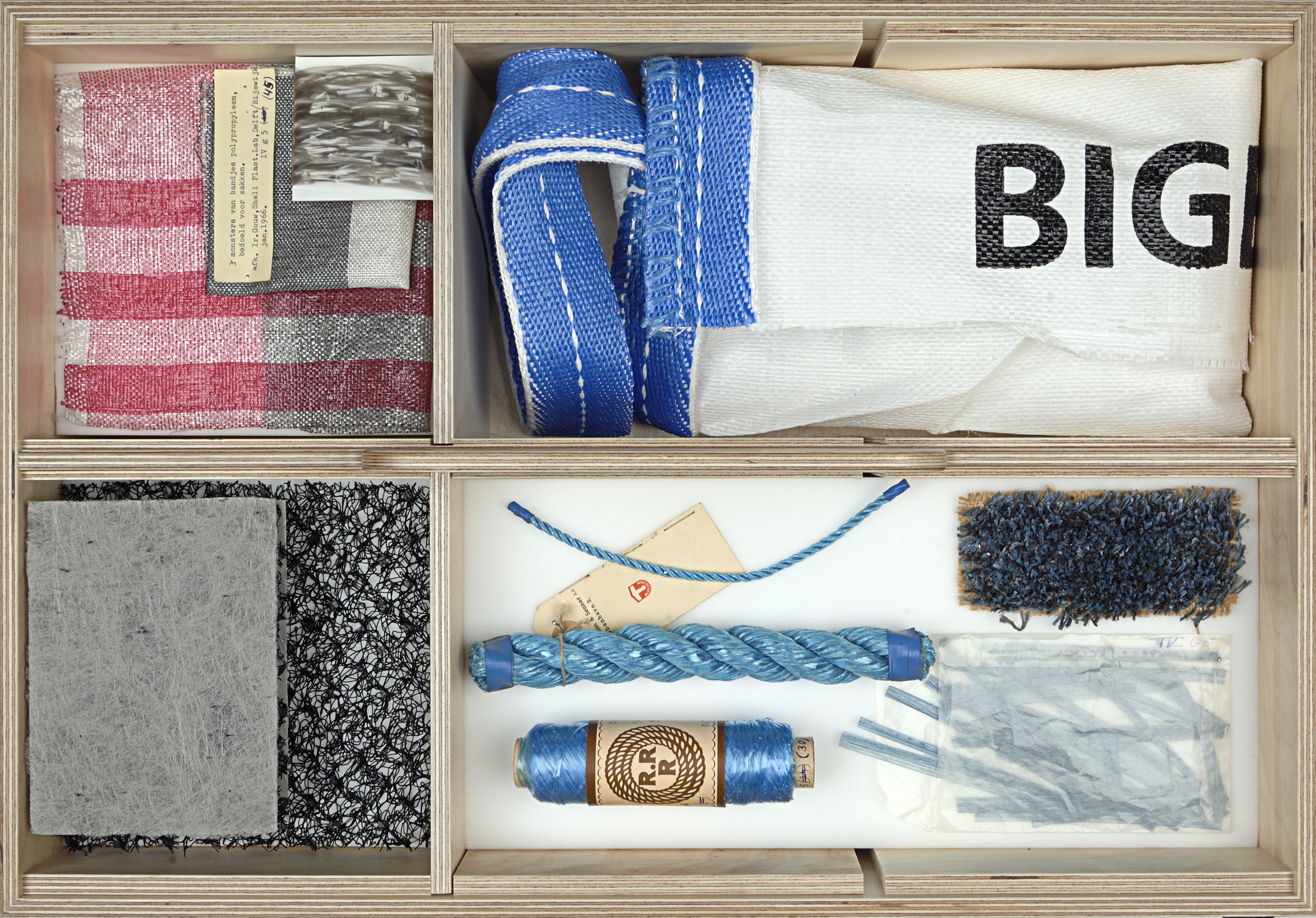
Various polypropylene yarns and textiles

Polypropylene is a major polymer used in nonwovens, with over 50% used for diapers and sanitary products where it is treated to absorb water (hydrophilic) rather than naturally repelling water (hydrophobic). Other non-woven uses include filters for air, gas, and liquids in which the fibers can be formed into sheets or webs that can be pleated to form cartridges or layers that filter in various efficiencies in the 0.5 to 30 micrometre range. Such applications occur in houses as water filters or in air-conditioning-type filters. The high surface-area and naturally oleophilic polypropylene nonwovens are ideal absorbers of oil spills with the familiar floating barriers near oil spills on rivers.

Polypropylene, or 'polypro', has been used for the fabrication of cold-weather base layer clothing, such as long-sleeve shirts and long underwear. Polypropylene is also used in warm-weather clothing, in which it transports sweat away from the skin. Polyester has replaced polypropylene in these applications in the U.S. military, such as in the ECWCS. Although polypropylene clothes are not easily flammable, they can melt, which may result in severe burns if the wearer is involved in an explosion or fire of any kind. Polypropylene undergarments are known for retaining body odors which are then difficult to remove. The current generation of polyester does not have this disadvantage.

=== Medical ===
Its most common medical use is in the synthetic, nonabsorbable suture Prolene, manufactured by Ethicon Inc.

Polypropylene has been used in hernia and pelvic organ prolapse repair operations to protect the body from new hernias in the same location. A small patch of the material is placed over the spot of the hernia, below the skin, and is painless and rarely, if ever, rejected by the body. However, a polypropylene mesh will erode the tissue surrounding it over the uncertain period from days to years.

A notable application was as a transvaginal mesh, used to treat vaginal prolapse and concurrent urinary incontinence. Due to the above-mentioned propensity for polypropylene mesh to erode the tissue surrounding it, the FDA has issued several warnings on the use of polypropylene mesh medical kits for certain applications in pelvic organ prolapse, specifically when introduced in close proximity to the vaginal wall due to a continued increase in number of mesh-driven tissue erosions reported by patients over the past few years. On 3 January 2012, the FDA ordered 35 manufacturers of these mesh products to study the side effects of these devices. Due to the outbreak of the COVID-19 pandemic in 2020, the demand for PP has increased significantly because it is a vital raw material for producing meltblown fabric, which is in turn the raw material for producing facial masks.

== Recycling ==
Most polypropylene recycling uses mechanical recycling, as for polyethylene: the material is heated to soften or melt it, and mechanically formed it into new products. As of 2015, less than 1% of polypropylene generated was recycled. Heating degrades the carbon backbone more severely than for polyethylene, breaking it into smaller organic molecules, because the methyl side group of PP is susceptible to thermo-oxidative and photo-oxidative degradation.

Polypropylene can also be recycled via pyrolysis; studies indicate that this may be more environmentally friendly than other methods of recycling.

Polypropylene has the number "5" as its resin identification code:

== Repairing ==
PP can be melted using a speed tip welding technique. With speed welding, the plastic welder, similar to a soldering iron in appearance and wattage, is fitted with a feed tube for the plastic weld rod. The speed tip heats the rod and the substrate, while at the same time it presses the molten weld rod into position. A bead of softened plastic is laid into the joint and the parts and weld rod fuse. With polypropylene, the melted welding rod must be "mixed" with the semi-melted base material being fabricated or repaired. A speed tip "gun" is essentially a soldering iron with a broad, flat tip that can be used to melt the weld joint and filler material to create a bond.

== Health concerns ==
Polypropylene was the most common microplastic fiber found in the olfactory bulbs in 8 of 15 deceased individuals in a study.

== Combustibility ==
Like all organic compounds, polypropylene is combustible. The flash point of a typical composition is 260 °C; autoignition temperature is 388 °C.
