= Ziegler–Natta catalyst =

Catalyst for synthesis of polymers of 1-alkenes

A Ziegler–Natta catalyst, named after Karl Ziegler and Giulio Natta, is a catalyst used in the synthesis of polymers of 1-alkenes (alpha-olefins). Two broad classes of Ziegler–Natta catalysts are employed, distinguished by their solubility:

- Heterogeneous supported catalysts based on titanium compounds are used in polymerization reactions in combination with cocatalysts, organoaluminum compounds such as triethylaluminium, Al(C_{2}H_{5})_{3}. This class of catalyst dominates the industry.
- Homogeneous catalysts usually based on complexes of the group 4 metals titanium, zirconium or hafnium. They are usually used in combination with a different organoaluminum cocatalyst, methylaluminoxane (or methylalumoxane, MAO). These catalysts traditionally contain metallocenes but also feature multidentate oxygen- and nitrogen-based ligands.

Ziegler–Natta catalysts are used to polymerize terminal alkenes (ethylene and alkenes with the vinyl double bond):

n CH_{2}=CHR → −[CH_{2}−CHR]_{n}−;

== History ==
The 1963 Nobel Prize in Chemistry was awarded to German Karl Ziegler, for his discovery of first titanium-based catalysts, and Italian Giulio Natta, for using them to prepare stereoregular polymers from propylene. Ziegler–Natta catalysts have been used in the commercial manufacture of various polyolefins since 1956. As of 2010, the total volume of plastics, elastomers, and rubbers produced from alkenes with these and related (especially Phillips) catalysts worldwide exceeds 100 million tonnes. Together, these polymers represent the largest-volume commodity plastics as well as the largest-volume commodity chemicals in the world.

In the early 1950s workers at Phillips Petroleum discovered that chromium catalysts are highly effective for the low-temperature polymerization of ethylene, which launched major industrial technologies culminating in the Phillips catalyst. A few years later, Ziegler discovered that a combination of titanium tetrachloride (TiCl_{4}) and diethylaluminium chloride (Al(C_{2}H_{5})_{2}Cl) gave comparable activities for the production of polyethylene. Natta used crystalline α-TiCl_{3} in combination with Al(C_{2}H_{5})_{3} to produce first isotactic polypropylene. Usually Ziegler catalysts refer to titanium-based systems for conversions of ethylene and Ziegler–Natta catalysts refer to systems for conversions of propylene.

Also, in the 1960s, BASF developed a gas-phase, mechanically-stirred polymerization process for making polypropylene. In that process, the particle bed in the reactor was either not fluidized or not fully fluidized. In 1968, the first gas-phase fluidized-bed polymerization process, the Unipol process, was commercialized by Union Carbide to produce polyethylene. In the mid-1980s, the Unipol process was further extended to produce polypropylene.

In the 1970s, magnesium chloride (MgCl_{2}) was discovered to greatly enhance the activity of the titanium-based catalysts. These catalysts were so active that the removal of unwanted amorphous polymer and residual titanium from the product (so-called deashing) was no longer necessary, enabling the commercialization of linear low-density polyethylene (LLDPE) resins and allowed the development of fully amorphous copolymers.

The fluidized-bed process remains one of the two most widely used processes for producing polypropylene.

== Stereochemistry of poly-1-alkenes ==
Natta first used polymerization catalysts based on titanium chlorides to polymerize propylene and other 1-alkenes. He discovered that these polymers are crystalline materials and ascribed their crystallinity to a special feature of the polymer structure called stereoregularity.

Short segments of polypropylene, showing examples of isotactic (above) and syndiotactic (below) tacticity.

The concept of stereoregularity in polymer chains is illustrated in the picture on the left with polypropylene. Stereoregular poly(1-alkene) can be isotactic or syndiotactic depending on the relative orientation of the alkyl groups in polymer chains consisting of units −[CH_{2}−CHR]−, like the CH_{3} groups in the figure. In the isotactic polymers, all stereogenic centers CHR share the same configuration. The stereogenic centers in syndiotactic polymers alternate their relative configuration. A polymer that lacks any regular arrangement in the position of its alkyl substituents (R) is called atactic. Both isotactic and syndiotactic polypropylene are crystalline, whereas atactic polypropylene, which can also be prepared with special Ziegler–Natta catalysts, is amorphous.

Ultimately, the stereoregularity of the polymer is determined by the catalyst used to prepare it. Most polymers produced with a Ziegler-Natta catalyst are enantioselective site-controlled, meaning the stereochemistry of each added monomer is dependent primarily on the stereochemistry of the catalyst (barring stereo errors) rather than the stereochemistry of the previous monomer. Thus, the chirality of the catalyst greatly influences tacticity. For example, achiral bis(2-phenylindenyl)zirconium dichloride produces isotactic polymers whereas its chiral variant produces syndiotactic polymers. The attachment of bulky ligands to the metal center results in steric hindrance, designed to restrict the orientation from which the incoming alkene can attack the metal center.

Unique behaviors of the catalyst can also strongly impact tacticity. For example, the open site of VCl_{4}/Al(C_{2}H_{5})_{2}Cl alternates between the axial and equatorial site with every monomer addition. As a result, each successive propylene monomer will insert into the vanadium-carbon bond from opposite sides. The alternating active site geometry thus produces a polymer chain with alternating enantiomeric configurations, producing syndiotactic polypropylene. See #Mechanism of Ziegler–Natta polymerization for the detailed mechanism.

=== Heterogeneous catalysts ===
The first and dominant class of titanium-based catalysts (and some vanadium-based catalysts) for alkene polymerization can be roughly subdivided into two subclasses, both heterogeneous catalysts:

- catalysts suitable for homopolymerization of ethylene and for ethylene/1-alkene copolymerization reactions leading to copolymers with a low 1-alkene content, 2–4 mol% (LLDPE resins), and
- catalysts suitable for the synthesis of isotactic 1-alkenes.

The overlap between these two subclasses is relatively small because the requirements to the respective catalysts differ widely.

Commercial catalysts are supported by being bound to a solid with a high surface area. Both TiCl_{4} and TiCl_{3} give active catalysts. The support in the majority of the catalysts is MgCl_{2}. A third component of most catalysts is a carrier, a material that determines the size and the shape of catalyst particles. The preferred carrier is microporous spheres of amorphous silica with a diameter of 30–40 mm. During the catalyst synthesis, both the titanium compounds and MgCl_{2} are packed into the silica pores. All these catalysts are activated with organoaluminum compounds such as Al(C_{2}H_{5})_{3}.

All modern supported Ziegler–Natta catalysts designed for polymerization of propylene and higher 1-alkenes are prepared with TiCl_{4} as the active ingredient and MgCl_{2} as a support. Another component of all such catalysts is an organic modifier, usually an ester of an aromatic diacid or a diether. The modifiers react both with inorganic ingredients of the solid catalysts as well as with organoaluminum cocatalysts. These catalysts polymerize propylene and other 1-alkenes to highly crystalline isotactic polymers.

=== Homogeneous catalysts ===
A second class of Ziegler–Natta catalysts are soluble in the reaction medium. Traditionally such homogeneous catalysts were derived from metallocenes, but the structures of active catalysts have been significantly broadened to include nitrogen-based ligands.

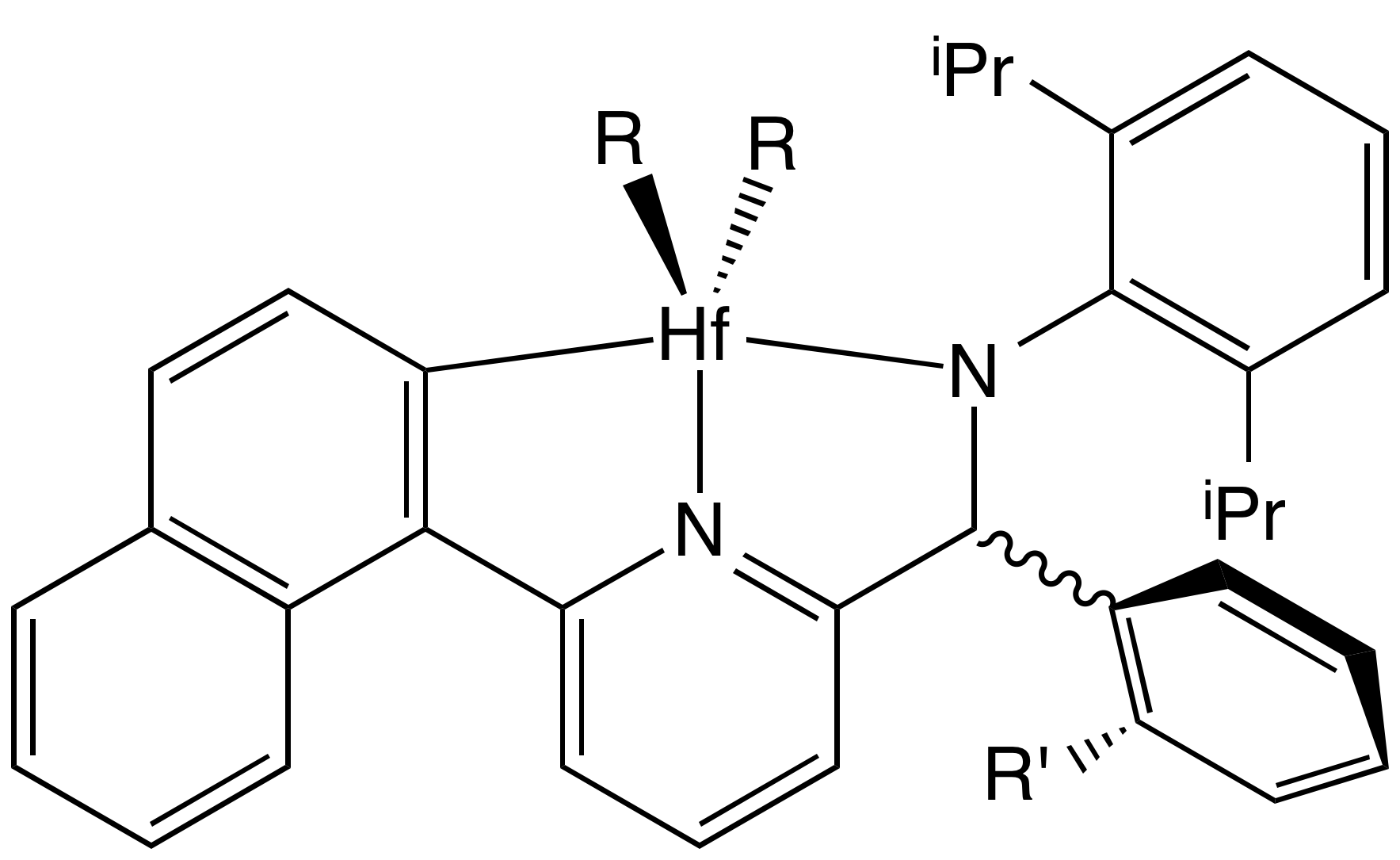
A post-metallocene catalyst developed at Dow Chemical.

==== Metallocene catalysts ====
These catalysts are metallocenes together with a cocatalyst, typically MAO, −[O−Al(CH_{3})]_{n}−. The idealized metallocene catalysts have the composition Cp_{2}MCl_{2} (M = Ti, Zr, Hf) such as titanocene dichloride. Typically, the organic ligands are derivatives of cyclopentadienyl. In some complexes, the two cyclopentadiene (Cp) rings are linked with bridges, like −CH_{2}−CH_{2}− or >SiPh_{2}. Depending on the type of their cyclopentadienyl ligands, for example by using an ansa-bridge, metallocene catalysts can produce either isotactic or syndiotactic polymers of propylene and other 1-alkenes.

Metallocenes are referred to as single-site catalysts, where the active site across each metallocene complex is structurally identical. The surface of a heterogeneous catalyst is not uniform, so there are many different active sites with differing electronic environments. As the structure of the active site directly affects the stereoregularity and tacticity, heterogeneous catalysts may produce polymers with a broader range of tacticities. Metallocenes do not suffer from this weakness, and so often result in polymers with greater stereoregularity and narrower molecular weight distributions. The chirality of the metallocene is a major determinant in whether the polymer is isotactic or syndiotactic.

==== Non-metallocene catalysts ====
Ziegler–Natta catalysts of the third class, non-metallocene catalysts, use a variety of complexes of various metals, ranging from scandium to lanthanoid and actinoid metals, and a large variety of ligands containing oxygen (O_{2}), nitrogen (N_{2}), phosphorus (P), and sulfur (S). The complexes are activated using MAO, as is done for metallocene catalysts.

Most Ziegler–Natta catalysts and all the alkylaluminium cocatalysts are unstable in air, and the alkylaluminium compounds are pyrophoric. The catalysts, therefore, are always prepared and handled under an inert atmosphere.

== Mechanism of Ziegler–Natta polymerization ==
The structure of active centers in Ziegler–Natta catalysts is well established only for metallocene catalysts. An idealized and simplified metallocene complex Cp_{2}ZrCl_{2} represents a typical precatalyst. It is unreactive toward alkenes. The dihalide reacts with MAO and is transformed into a metallocenium ion Cp_{2}CH_{3}, which is ion-paired to some derivative(s) of MAO. A polymer molecule grows by numerous insertion reactions of C=C bonds of 1-alkene molecules into the Zr–C bond in the ion:

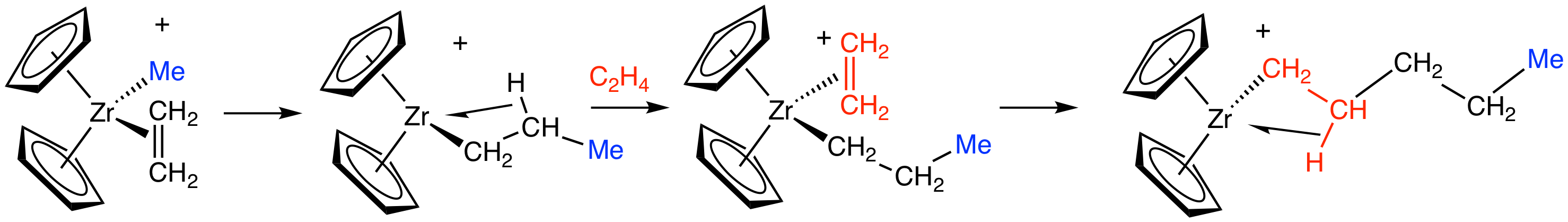
Simplified mechanism for Zr-catalyzed ethylene polymerization.

Many thousands of alkene insertion reactions occur at each active center resulting in the formation of long polymer chains attached to the center. The Cossee–Arlman mechanism describes the growth of stereospecific polymers. This mechanism states that the polymer grows through alkene coordination at a vacant site at the titanium atom, which is followed by insertion of the C=C bond into the Ti−C bond at the active center.

=== Orbital interactions of initial coordination ===
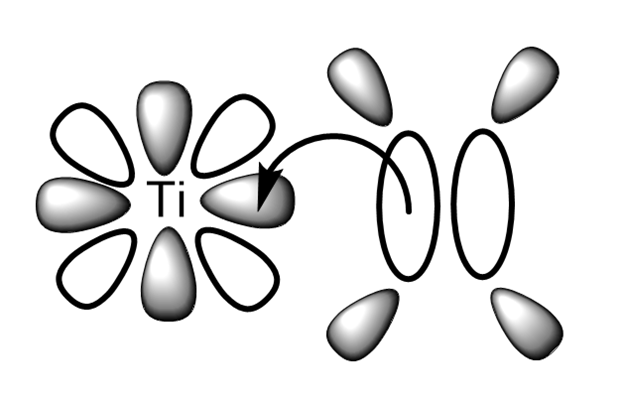
The electrons in the filled pi-orbital (white) of the alkene are donated to the empty d-orbital (grey) of the titanium.

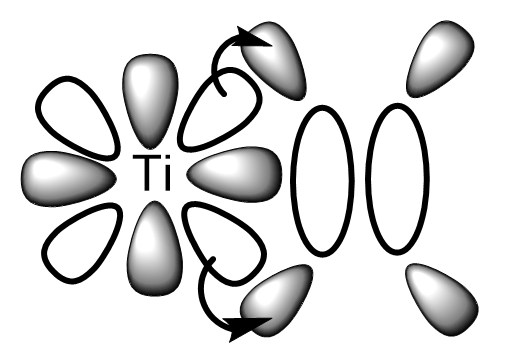
The electrons in one of the filled d-orbitals (white) of titanium are accepted by the antibonding pi orbital (grey) of the alkene.

Upon coordination of the alkene to the catalyst, the alkene donates electrons from its pi-bonding orbital into the metal center's empty d orbital while also accepting electrons from the metal's filled d orbitals into its empty pi anti-bonding orbital. The synergy of these interactions stabilize the overall bond between the alkene and metal center and thus facilitates initial coordination.

=== Termination processes ===
On occasion, the polymer chain is disengaged from the active centers in the chain termination reaction. Several pathways exist for termination:

Cp_{2}−(CH_{2}−CHR)_{n}−CH_{3} + CH_{2}=CHR → Cp_{2}−CH_{2}−CH_{2}R + CH_{2}=CR–polymer

Another type of chain termination reaction called a β-hydride elimination reaction also occurs periodically:

Cp_{2}−(CH_{2}−CHR)_{n}−CH_{3} → Cp_{2}−H + CH_{2}=CR–polymer

Polymerization reactions of alkenes with solid titanium-based catalysts occur at special titanium centers located on the exterior of the catalyst crystallites. Some titanium atoms in these crystallites react with organoaluminum cocatalysts with the formation of Ti–C bonds. The polymerization reaction of alkenes occurs similarly to the reactions in metallocene catalysts:

L_{n}Ti–CH_{2}−CHR–polymer + CH_{2}=CHR → L_{n}Ti–CH_{2}-CHR–CH_{2}−CHR–polymer

The two chain termination reactions occur quite rarely in Ziegler–Natta catalysis and the formed polymers have a too high molecular weight to be of commercial use. To reduce the molecular weight, hydrogen is added to the polymerization reaction:

L_{n}Ti–CH_{2}−CHR–polymer + H_{2} → L_{n}Ti−H + CH_{3}−CHR–polymer

Another termination process involves the action of protic (acidic) reagents, which can be intentionally added or adventitious.

== Commercial polymers prepared with Ziegler–Natta catalysts ==
- Polyethylene
- Polypropylene
- Copolymers of ethylene and 1-alkenes
- Polybutene-1
- Polymethylpentene
- Polycycloolefins
- Polybutadiene
- Polyisoprene
- Amorphous poly-alpha-olefins (APAO)
- Polyacetylene
