= Tacticity =

Relative conformational uniformity of repeating units in a macromolecule

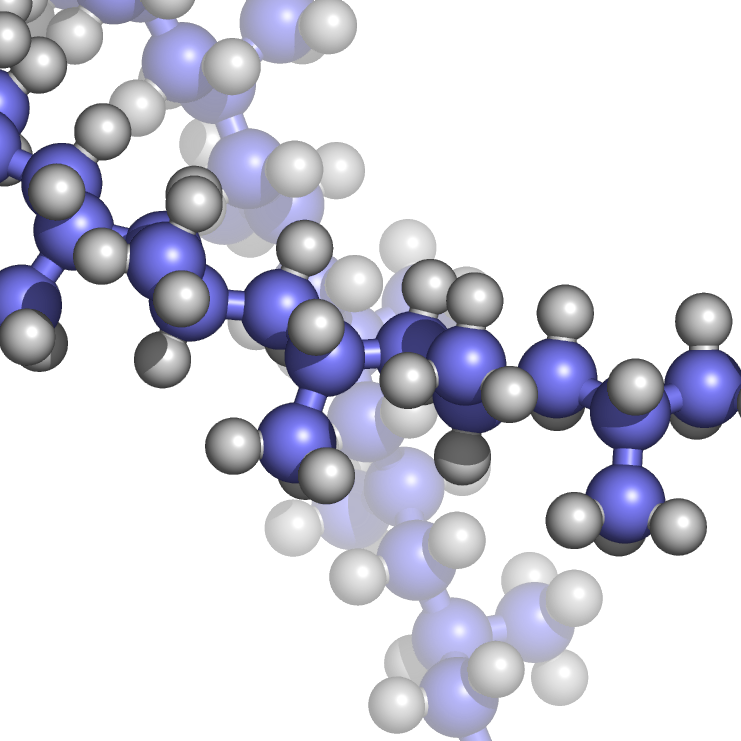
A ball-and-stick model of syndiotactic polypropylene.

Tacticity is the orderliness of the succession of configurational repeating units along the main chain of a macromolecule. Tacticity can be described using pairs of adjacent stereogenic units, known as diads, and longer sequences such as triads, tetrads, and pentads. In vinyl polymers, an isotactic macromolecule predominantly has the same stereochemical relationship between successive stereogenic units, a syndiotactic macromolecule predominantly has the alternative relationship, and an atactic macromolecule has no regular stereochemical sequence.

Tacticity can strongly influence the physical properties of a polymer because it affects how regularly its chains can pack and therefore its crystallinity. Isotactic and syndiotactic polymers can form semicrystalline materials, whereas atactic polymers are generally amorphous. Consequently, different tactic forms of the same polymer can differ in properties including mechanical strength, melting point, solubility, solvent resistance, barrier properties, and optical clarity.

Polymers with controlled tacticity are produced by stereocontrolled polymerization, in which stereoselectivity can arise from control by the growing polymer chain end or by the stereochemical environment of the catalyst. Tacticity is most commonly quantified using NMR spectroscopy, particularly proton or carbon-13 NMR, by measuring the relative abundances of diads, triads, or longer stereochemical sequences. Other methods sensitive to tacticity are X-ray powder diffraction, vibrational spectroscopy, and secondary ion mass spectrometry.

== Definition ==
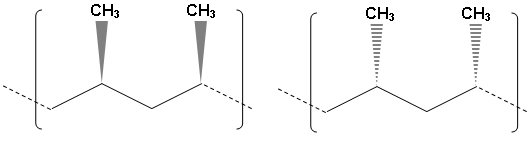
Examples of m diads in a polypropylene molecule.

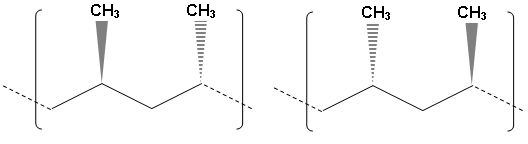
Examples of r diads in a polypropylene molecule.

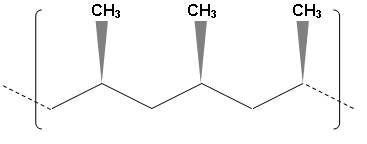
An isotactic (mm) triad in a polypropylene molecule.

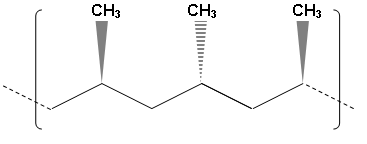
A syndiotactic (rr) triad in a polypropylene molecule.

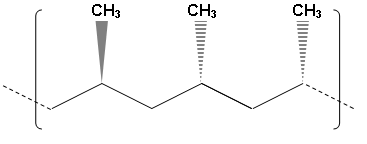
A heterotactic (rm) triad in a polypropylene molecule.

=== Diads ===
Two adjacent structural units in a polymer molecule constitute a diad. Diads overlap: each structural unit is considered part of two diads, one diad with each neighbor. If a diad consists of two identically oriented units, the diad is called an m diad (formerly meso diad, as in a meso compound, now proscribed). If a diad consists of units oriented in opposition, the diad is called an r diad (formerly racemo diad, as in a racemic compound, now proscribed). In the case of vinyl polymer molecules, an m diad is one in which the substituents are oriented on the same side of the polymer backbone; in the Natta projection, they both point into the plane or both point out of the plane.

=== Triads ===
The stereochemistry of macromolecules can be defined even more precisely with the introduction of triads. An isotactic triad (mm) is made up of two overlapping m diads, a syndiotactic triad (also spelled syndyotactic) (rr) consists of two overlapping r diads, and a heterotactic triad (rm) is composed of an r diad overlapping an m diad. The mass fraction of isotactic (mm) triads is a common quantitative measure of tacticity.

When the stereochemistry of a macromolecule is considered to be a Bernoulli process, the triad composition can be calculated from the probability P_{m} of a diad being m type. For example, when this probability is 0.25 then the probability of finding:

- an isotactic triad is P_{m}^{2}, or 0.0625
- an heterotactic triad is 2P_{m}(1–P_{m}), or 0.375
- a syndiotactic triad is (1–P_{m})^{2}, or 0.5625

with a total probability of 1. Similar relationships with diads exist for tetrads.

=== Tetrads, pentads, etc. ===
The definition of tetrads and pentads introduce further sophistication and precision to defining tacticity, especially when information on long-range ordering is desirable. Tacticity measurements obtained by carbon-13 NMR are typically expressed in terms of the relative abundance of various pentads within the polymer molecule, e.g. mmmm, mrrm.

=== Other conventions for quantifying tacticity ===
The primary convention for expressing tacticity is in terms of the relative weight fraction of triad or higher-order components, as described above. An alternative expression for tacticity is the average length of m and r sequences within the polymer molecule. The average m-sequence length may be approximated from the relative abundance of pentads as follows:

$MSL = \frac{mmmm + \tfrac{3}{2} mrrr + 2 rmmr + \tfrac{1}{2} rmrm + \tfrac{1}{2} rmrr}{\tfrac{1}{2} mmmr + rmmr + \tfrac{1}{2}rmrm + \tfrac{1}{2}rmrr}$

== Polymers ==
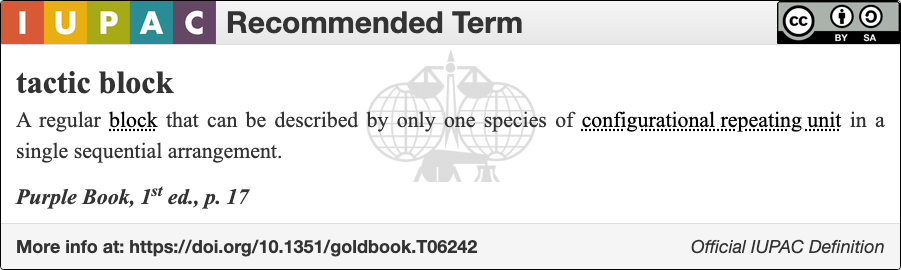
IUPAC definition for a tactic block in a polymer

=== Isotactic polymers ===
Isotactic polymers are composed of isotactic macromolecules (IUPAC definition). In isotactic macromolecules, all the substituents are located on the same side of the macromolecular backbone. An isotactic macromolecule consists of 100% m diads, though IUPAC also allows the term for macromolecules with at least 95% m diads if that looser usage is explained. Polypropylene formed by Ziegler–Natta catalysis is an example of an isotactic polymer. Isotactic polymers are usually semicrystalline and generally (but not exclusively) crystallize in a helical configuration.

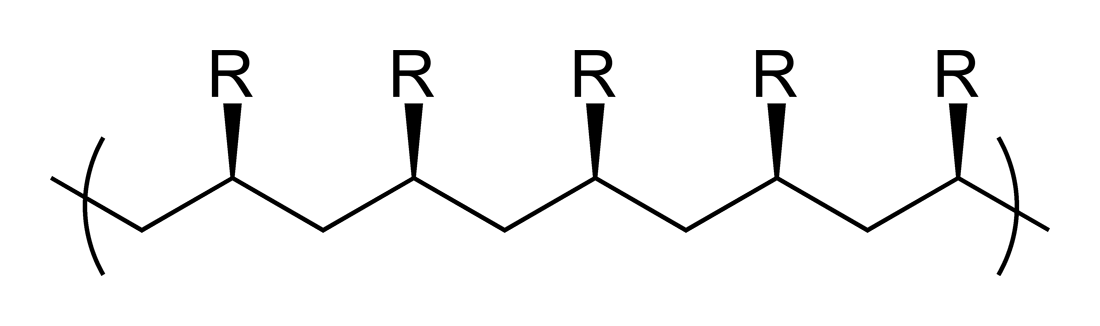
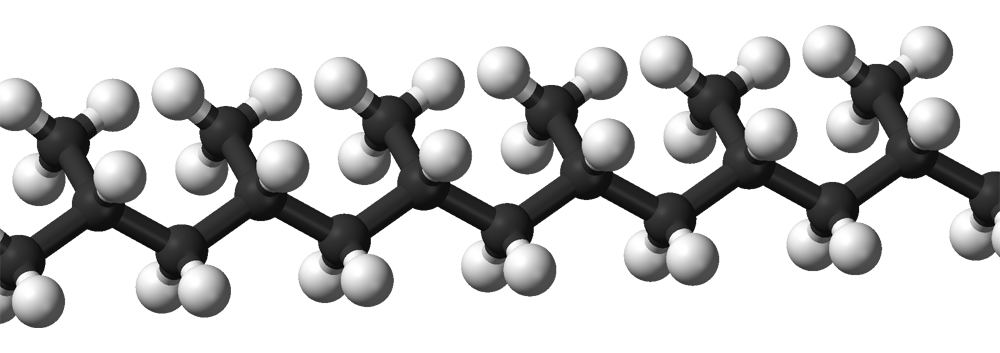

=== Syndiotactic polymers ===
In syndiotactic or syntactic macromolecules the substituents have alternate positions along the chain. The macromolecule comprises 100% r diads, though IUPAC also allows the term for macromolecules with at least 95% r diads if that looser usage is explained. Syndiotactic polystyrene, made by metallocene catalysis polymerization, is crystalline with a melting point of 270 °C and a glass transition temperature (Tg) of about 100 °C. Gutta percha is also an example syndiotactic polymer.

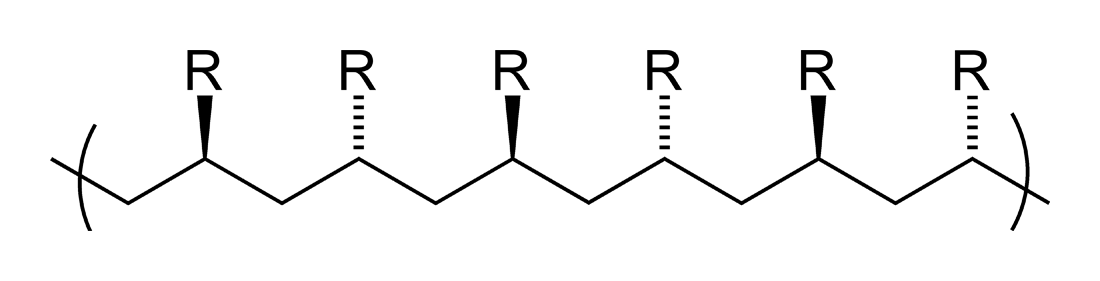
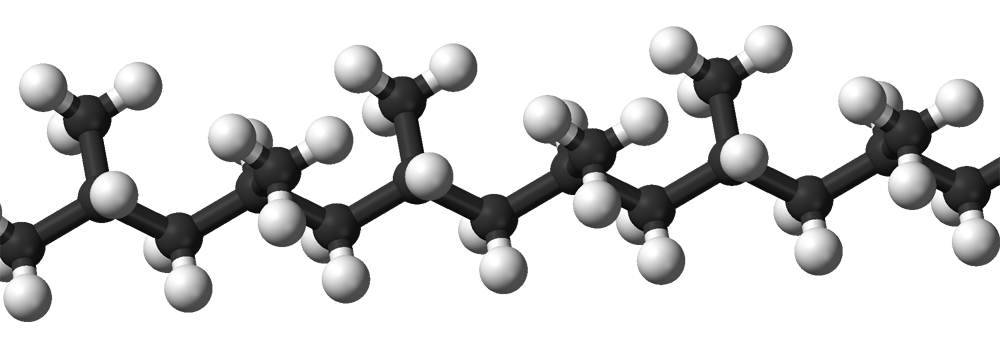

=== Atactic polymers ===
In atactic macromolecules the substituents are placed randomly along the chain. The percentage of m diads is understood to be between 45 and 55% unless otherwise specified, but it could be any value other than 0 or 100% if that usage is clarified. With the aid of spectroscopic techniques such as NMR, it is possible to pinpoint the composition of a polymer in terms of the percentages for each triad.

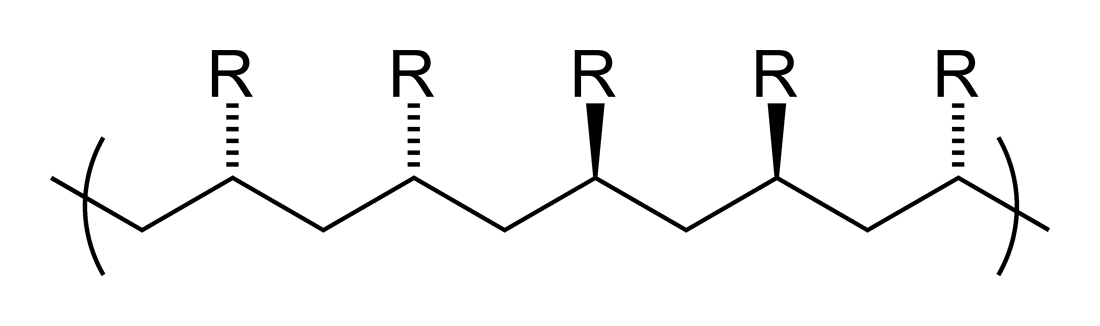

Polymers that are formed by free-radical mechanisms, such as polyvinyl chloride are usually atactic. Due to their random nature atactic polymers are usually amorphous. In hemi-isotactic macromolecules every other repeat unit has a random substituent.

Atactic polymers such as polystyrene (PS) are technologically very important. It is possible to obtain syndiotactic polystyrene using a Kaminsky catalyst, but most industrial polystyrene produced is atactic. The two materials have very different properties because the irregular structure of the atactic version makes it impossible for the polymer chains to stack in a regular fashion: whereas syndiotactic PS is a semicrystalline material, the more common atactic version cannot crystallize and forms a glass instead.

=== Eutactic polymers ===
In eutactic macromolecules, substituents may occupy any specific (but potentially complex) sequence of positions along the chain. Isotactic and syndiotactic polymers are instances of the more general class of eutactic polymers, which also includes heterogeneous macromolecules in which the sequence consists of substituents of different kinds (for example, the side-chains in proteins and the bases in nucleic acids).

== Effect on polymer properties ==
Tacticity has a significant effect on polymer crystallinity, and thus affects other properties that depend on crystallinity such as strength, melting point, and solubility. Isotactic and syndiotactic polymers have a more ordered structure and can form semicrystalline materials, while atactic polymers are generally amorphous (i.e. not crystalline) because their lack of order prevents them from packing into a crystal lattice. Crystallinity generally leads to better mechanical strength, solvent resistance, and barrier properties, but amorphous polymers do not necessarily have poor mechanical properties and can have other advantages such as optical clarity. As an example, atactic polypropylene is an amorphous polymer with a glass-transition temperature, T_{g}, of -27 °C, while isotactic polypropylene is crystalline with a T_{g} of -26 °C and a melting temperature, T_{m}, of 160 °C and syndiotactic polypropylene is also crystalline with a higher T_{g} of -4.3 °C and a lower T_{m} of 126 °C. Isotactic polypropylene is strong and high-melting and so is widely used in a range of applications, while atactic polypropylene is soft and waxy and sees only limited use in adhesives and as an asphalt additive.

== Stereocontrolled polymerization ==
Polymers with controlled tacticity (i.e. not atactic) must be produced via some type of stereocontrolled polymerization. Stereocontrolled polymerizations have been demonstrated with a variety of chain-growth polymerization mechanisms, although stereocontrolled radical and cationic polymerizations are less common than stereocontrolled coordination and anionic polymerizations due to a lack of stereochemical definition at the propagating chain end. Stereocontrolled polymerization of chiral monomers can also be enantioselective, meaning that one enantiomer of the monomer is selectively polymerized to give an isotactic polymer. Depending on the origin of stereoselectivity, stereocontrolled polymerizations can be classified as polymer chain-end control or enantiomorphic site control.

=== Polymer chain-end control ===
In polymer chain-end control, the stereochemistry of the most recent monomer added to the polymer chain determines the stereochemistry of the next monomer added. In an isoselective polymerization, the next monomer to be inserted will have the same stereochemistry as the previous monomer, while in a syndioselective polymerization it will be the opposite. The stereoselectivity of a polymerization with polymer chain-end control is quantified by P_{m} and P_{r}, the probabilities of forming an m and r diad, respectively. An isoselective polymerization has a P_{m} approaching 1, while a syndioselective polymerization has a P_{r} approaching 1. When a stereoerror occurs (i.e. a monomer is added in the less favored orientation, such as the formation of a r diad in an isoselective polymerization), it is propagated, meaning that in an isoselective polymerization the substituents would switch from all being on one side of the polymer chain to all being on the other side.

=== Enantiomorphic site control ===
In enantiomorphic site control, the stereochemistry of the next monomer added is instead determined by the stereochemistry of the catalyst. The stereoselectivity of a polymerization with enantiomorphic site control is often quantified by the site control selectivity α, the probability of adding a monomer with a certain absolute configuration. For an isoselective polymerization, an α value of 0 or 1 indicates a fully isotactic polymer while an α value of 0.5 indicates an atactic polymer. When a stereoerror occurs, it is corrected, meaning that (in an isoselective polymerization) substituents will return to being on the same side of the polymer chain that they were on before the error.

== Head/tail configuration ==

In vinyl polymers, the complete configuration can be further described by defining polymer head/tail configuration. In a regular macromolecule, monomer units are normally linked in a head to tail configuration such that β-substituents are located on alternating carbon atoms. However, it is possible for defects to form where substituents are placed on adjacent carbon atoms, producing a head/head tail/tail configuration, such as by recombination of two growing radical chains, or by direct head-head addition if steric effects are weak enough, such as in polyvinylidene fluoride.

== Techniques for measuring tacticity ==
Tacticity may be measured directly using proton or carbon-13 NMR. This technique enables quantification of the tacticity distribution by comparison of peak areas or integral ranges corresponding to known diads (r, m), triads (mm, rm+mr, rr) and/or higher order n-ads, depending on spectral resolution. In cases of limited resolution, stochastic methods such as Bernoullian or Markovian analysis may also be used to fit the distribution and predict higher n-ads and calculate the isotacticity of the polymer to the desired level.

Other techniques sensitive to tacticity include x-ray powder diffraction, secondary ion mass spectrometry (SIMS), vibrational spectroscopy (FTIR) and especially two-dimensional techniques. Tacticity may also be inferred by measuring another physical property, such as melting temperature, when the relationship between tacticity and that property is well-established.
