= Methylaluminoxane =

Identifiers
CAS Number	120144-90-3
3D model (JSmol)	Interactive image
ChemSpider	10687336
EC Number	485-360-0
PubChem CID	16685262
- InChI: InChI=1S/CH3.Al.O/h1H3;; Key: CPOFMOWDMVWCLF-UHFFFAOYSA-N
- SMILES: C[Al]=O

Properties
Chemical formula	(Al(CH_{3})_{x}O_{y})_{n}
Appearance	White solid

Hazards
- Occupational safety and health (OHS/OSH)
Main hazards	Pyrophoric
- GHS labelling
Pictograms	(GHS02: Flammable)
Signal word	Warning
Hazard statements	H228, H250, H252
Precautionary statements	P210, P222, P235+P410, P240, P241, P280, P302+P334, P370+P378, P407, P413, P420, P422
- Except where otherwise noted, data are given for materials in their standard state (at 25 °C [77 °F], 100 kPa). verify (what is ?) Infobox references

Methylaluminoxane, commonly called MAO, is a mixture of organoaluminium compounds with the approximate formula (Al(CH_{3})O)_{n}. It is usually encountered as a solution in (aromatic) solvents, commonly toluene but also xylene, cumene, or mesitylene, Used in large excess, it activates precatalysts for alkene polymerization.

== Preparation and structure ==
Structure of Al_{33}O_{26}(CH_{3})_{47}(Al_{2}(CH_{3})_{6}), an MAO crystallized by Luo, Younker, Zabula. The highlighted (CH_{3})_{2}Al^{+}sites are proposed to be released during catalyst activation.

MAO is prepared by the incomplete hydrolysis of trimethylaluminium, as indicated by this idealized equation:

n Al(CH_{3})_{3} + n H_{2}O → (Al(CH_{3})O)_{n} + 2n CH_{4}

After many years of study, single crystals of an active MAO were analyzed by X-ray crystallography. The molecule adopts a ruffled sheet of tetrahedral Al centers linked by triply bridging oxides.

== Uses ==
MAO is well known as catalyst activator for olefin polymerizations by homogeneous catalysis. In traditional Ziegler–Natta catalysis, supported titanium trichloride is activated by treatment with trimethylaluminium (TMA). TMA only weakly activates homogeneous precatalysts, such as zirconocene dichloride. In the mid-1970s Kaminsky discovered that metallocene dichlorides can be activated by MAO (see Kaminsky catalyst). The effect was discovered when a small amount of water was found to enhance the activity in the Ziegler–Natta system.

MAO serves multiple functions in the activation process. First it alkylates the metal-chloride pre-catalyst species giving Ti/Zr-methyl intermediates. Second, it abstracts a ligand from the methylated precatalysts, forming an electrophilic, coordinatively unsaturated catalysts that can undergo ethylene insertion. This activated catalyst is an ion pair between a cationic catalyst and an weakly basic MAO-derived anion. MAO also functions as scavenger for protic impurities.

== Previous studies ==
Diverse mechanisms have been proposed for the formation of MAO and many structures as well.

- Chen, E. Y.-X.; Marks, T. J. (2000). "Cocatalysts for Metal-Catalyzed Olefin Polymerization: Activators, Activation Processes, and Structure-Activity Relationships". Chem. Rev. 100 (4): 1391–1434. doi:10.1021/cr980462j. PMID 11749269.
- Lacramioara Negureanu; Randall W. Hall; Leslie G. Butler & Larry A. Simeral (2006). "Methyaluminoxane (MAO) Polymerization Mechanism and Kinetic Model from Ab Initio Molecular Dynamics and Electronic Structure Calculations". J. Am. Chem. Soc. 128 (51): 16816–16826. Bibcode:2006JAChS.12816816N. doi:10.1021/ja064545q. PMID 17177432.
- Harlan, C. Jeff; Mason, Mark R.; Barron, Andrew R. (1994). "Tert-Butylaluminum Hydroxides and Oxides: Structural Relationship between Alkylalumoxanes and Alumina Gels". Organometallics. 13 (8): 2957–2969. doi:10.1021/om00020a011.
- Mason, Mark R.; Smith, Janna M.; Bott, Simon G.; Barron, Andrew R. (1993). "Hydrolysis of tri-tert-Butylaluminum: The First Structural Characterization of Alkylalumoxanes [(R2Al)2O]n and (RAlO)n". Journal of the American Chemical Society. 115 (12): 4971–4984. Bibcode:1993JAChS.115.4971M. doi:10.1021/ja00065a005.
- Ziegler, T.; Zurek, E. (2004). "Theoretical studies of the structure and function of MAO (methylaluminoxane)". Progress in Polymer Science. 29 (2): 107–198. doi:10.1016/j.progpolymsci.2003.10.003.

== See also ==
- Aluminoxane
