= Polyethylene =

Most common thermoplastic polymer

- Skeletal formula of a ris monomer

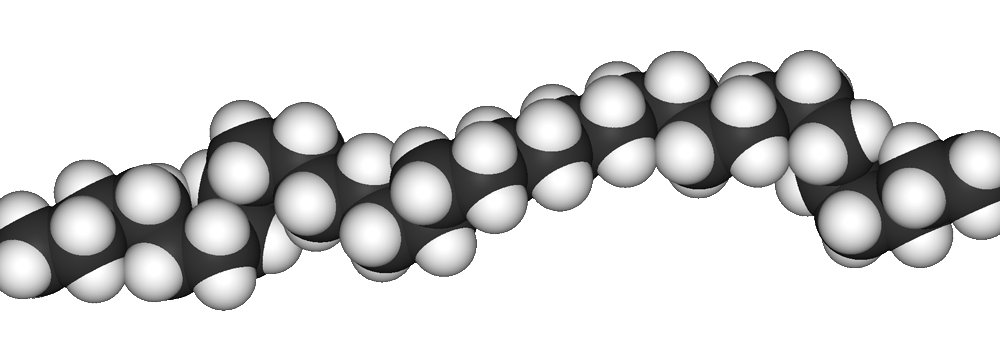
- Spacefill model of polyethylene

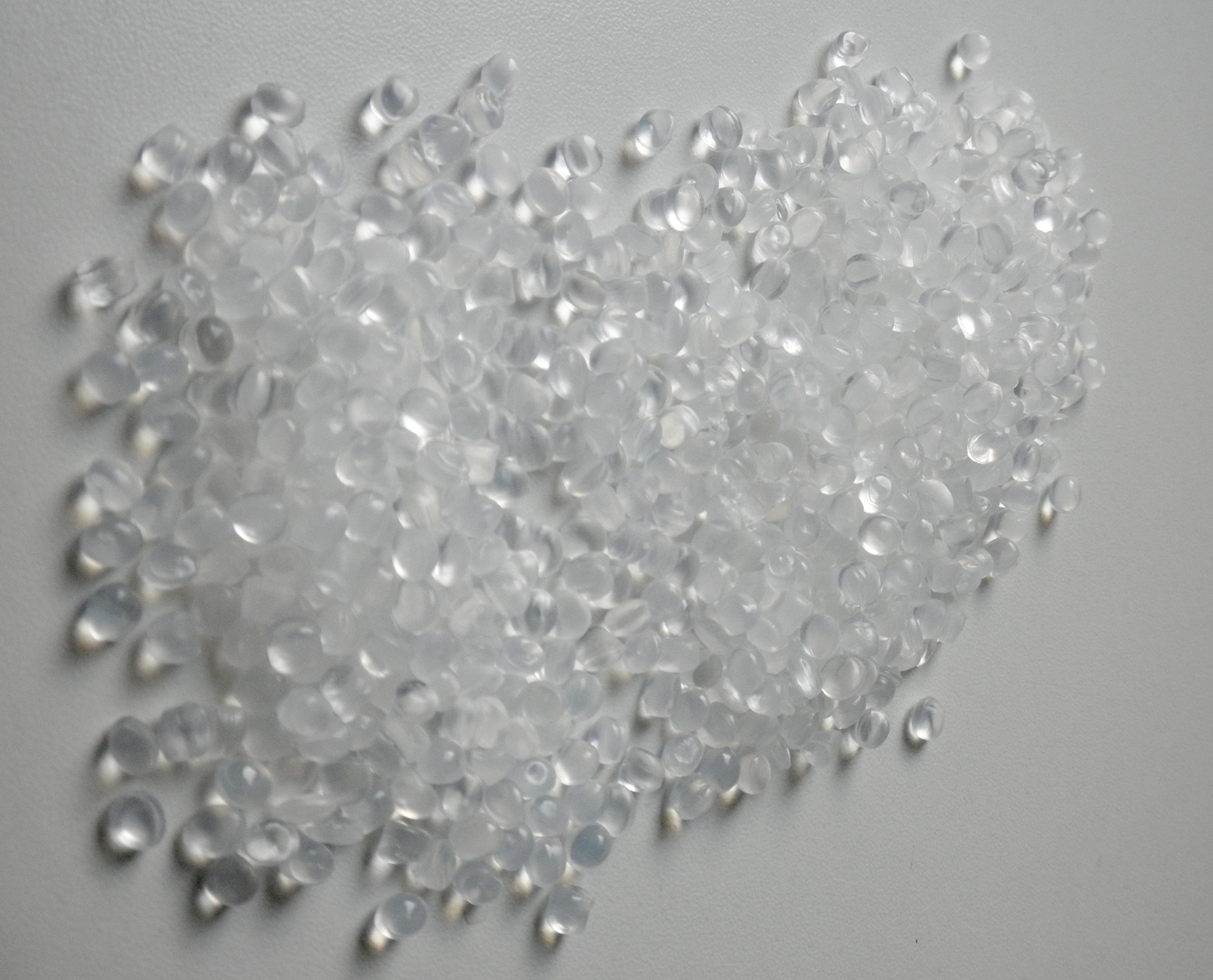
- Sample of granulated polyethylene

Names
- IUPAC name Polyethene or poly(methylene)
- Other names Polyethylene; Polythene

Identifiers
CAS Number	9002-88-4
Abbreviations	PE
ChemSpider	none
ECHA InfoCard	100.121.698
KEGG	C19503
MeSH	Polyethylene
PubChem CID	6325
UNII	3W404QE89S
CompTox Dashboard (EPA)	DTXSID8031946

Properties
Chemical formula	(C_{2}H_{4})_{n}
Density	0.88–0.96 g/cm^{3}
Melting point	115–135 °C (239–275 °F; 388–408 K)
Solubility in water	Not soluble
log P	1.02620
Magnetic susceptibility (χ)	−9.67×10^{−6} (HDPE, SI, 22 °C)

Thermochemistry
Std enthalpy of formation (Δ_{f}H^{⦵}_{298})	−28 to −29 kJ/mol
Heat of combustion, higher value (HHV)	650–651 kJ/mol, 46 MJ/kg
- Except where otherwise noted, data are given for materials in their standard state (at 25 °C [77 °F], 100 kPa). Infobox references

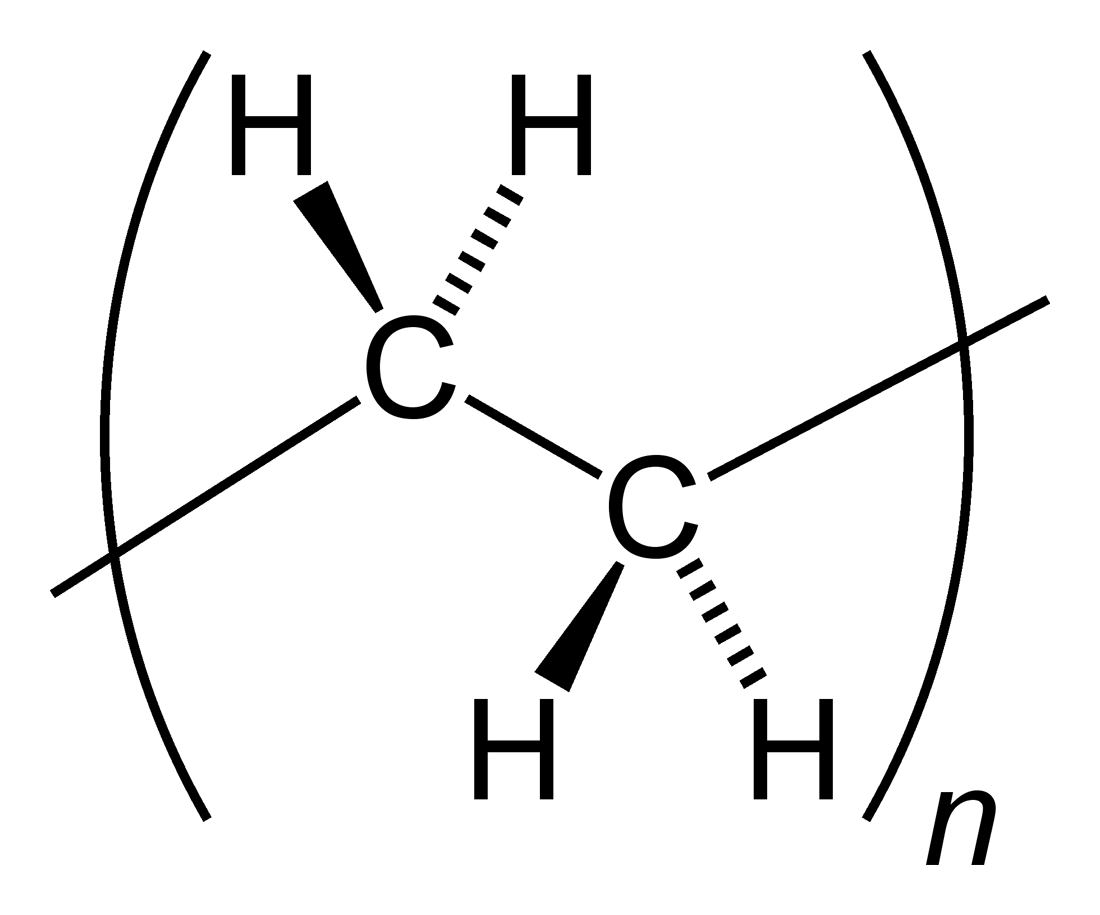
The repeating unit within polyethylene in the most stable staggered conformation

Polyethylene or polythene (abbreviated PE; IUPAC name polyethene or poly(methylene)) is the most commonly produced plastic. It is a polymer, primarily used for packaging (plastic bags, plastic films, geomembranes and containers including bottles, cups, jars, folders, etc.). As of 2017, over 100 million tonnes of polyethylene resins are being produced annually, accounting for 34% of the total plastics market.

Many kinds of polyethylene are known, with most having the chemical formula (C_{2}H_{4})_{n}. PE is usually a mixture of similar polymers of ethylene, with various values of n. It can be low-density or high-density and many variations thereof. Its properties can be modified further by crosslinking or copolymerization. All forms are nontoxic as well as chemically resilient, contributing to polyethylene's popularity as a multi-use plastic. However, polyethylene's chemical resilience also makes it a long-lived and decomposition-resistant pollutant when disposed of improperly. Being a hydrocarbon, polyethylene is colorless to opaque (without impurities or colorants) and combustible.

== History ==
Polyethylene was first synthesized by the German chemist Hans von Pechmann, who prepared it by accident in 1898 while investigating diazomethane. (Note: Erwähnt sei noch, dass aus einer ätherischen Diazomethanlösung sich beim Stehen manchmal minimale Quantitäten eines weissen, flockigen, aus Chloroform krystallisirenden Körpers abscheiden; ... [It should be mentioned that from an ether solution of diazomethane, upon standing, sometimes small quantities of a white, flakey substance precipitate, which can be crystallized with chloroform; ...].) (Note: Die Abscheidung weisser Flocken aus Diazomethanlösungen erwähnt auch v. Pechmann (diese Berichte 31, 2643); er hat sie aber wegen Substanzmangel nicht untersucht. Ich hatte übrigens Hrn. v. Pechmann schon einige Zeit vor Erscheinen seiner Publication mitgetheilt, dass aus Diazomethan ein fester, weisser Körper entstehe, der sich bei der Analyse als (CH_{2})_{x} erwiesen habe, worauf mir Hr. v. Pechmann schrieb, dass er den weissen Körper ebensfalls beobachtet, aber nicht untersucht habe. Zuerst erwähnt ist derselbe in der Dissertation meines Schülers. (Hindermann, Zürich (1897), S. 120) [Von Pechmann (these Reports, 31, 2643) also mentioned the precipitation of white flakes from diazomethane solutions; however, due to a scarcity of the material, he didn't investigate it. Incidentally, some time before the appearance of his publication, I had communicated to Mr. von Pechmann that a solid, white substance arose from diazomethane, which on analysis proved to be (CH_{2})_{x}, whereupon Mr. von Pechmann wrote me that he had likewise observed the white substance, but not investigated it. It is first mentioned in the dissertation of my student. (Hindermann, Zürich (1897), p. 120)].) When his colleagues Eugen Bamberger and Friedrich Tschirner characterized the white, waxy substance that he had created, they recognized that it contained long −CH_{2}− chains and termed it polymethylene.

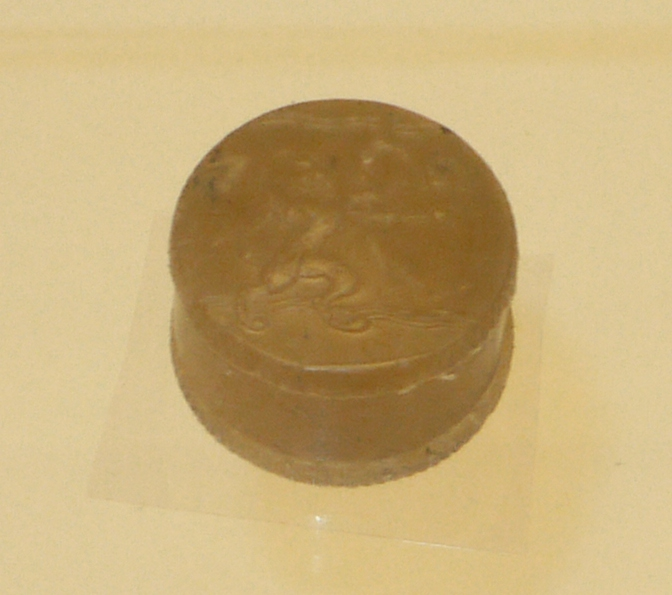
A pill box presented to a technician at ICI in 1936 made from the first pound of polyethylene

The first industrially practical polyethylene synthesis (diazomethane is a notoriously unstable substance that is generally avoided in industrial syntheses) was again accidentally discovered in 1933 by Eric Fawcett and Reginald Gibson at the Imperial Chemical Industries (ICI) works in Northwich, England. Upon applying extremely high pressure (several hundred atmospheres) to a mixture of ethylene and benzaldehyde they again produced a white, waxy material. Because the reaction had been initiated by trace oxygen contamination in their apparatus, the experiment was difficult to reproduce at first. It was not until 1935 that another ICI chemist, Michael Perrin, developed this accident into a reproducible high-pressure synthesis for polyethylene that became the basis for industrial low-density polyethylene (LDPE) production beginning in 1939. Because polyethylene was found to have very low-loss properties at very high frequency radio waves, commercial distribution in Britain was suspended on the outbreak of World War II, secrecy imposed, and the new process was used to produce insulation for UHF and SHF coaxial cables of radar sets. During World War II, further research was done on the ICI process and in 1944, DuPont at Sabine River, Texas, and Union Carbide Corporation at South Charleston, West Virginia, began large-scale commercial production under license from ICI.

The landmark breakthrough in the commercial production of polyethylene began with the development of catalysts that promoted the polymerization at mild temperatures and pressures. The first of these was a catalyst based on chromium trioxide discovered in 1951 by Robert Banks and J. Paul Hogan at Phillips Petroleum. In 1953 the German chemist Karl Ziegler developed a catalytic system based on titanium halides and organoaluminium compounds that worked at even milder conditions than the Phillips catalyst. The Phillips catalyst is less expensive and easier to work with, however, and both methods are heavily used industrially. By the end of the 1950s both the Phillips- and Ziegler-type catalysts were being used for high-density polyethylene (HDPE) production. In the 1970s, the Ziegler system was improved by the incorporation of magnesium chloride. Catalytic systems based on soluble catalysts, the metallocenes, were reported in 1976 by Walter Kaminsky and Hansjörg Sinn. The Ziegler- and metallocene-based catalysts families have proven to be very flexible at copolymerizing ethylene with other olefins and have become the basis for the wide range of polyethylene resins available today, including very-low-density polyethylene and linear low-density polyethylene. Such resins, in the form of UHMWPE fibers, have (as of 2005) begun to replace aramids in many high-strength applications.

== Properties ==
The properties of polyethylene depend strongly on type. The molecular weight, crosslinking, and presence of comonomers all strongly affect its properties. It is for this structure-property relation that intense effort has been invested into diverse kinds of PE. LDPE is softer and more transparent than HDPE. For medium- and high-density polyethylene the melting point is typically in the range 120 to 130 °C (248 to 266 °F). The melting point for average commercial low-density polyethylene is typically 105 to 115 °C (221 to 239 °F). These temperatures vary strongly with the type of polyethylene, but the theoretical upper limit of melting of polyethylene is reported to be 144 to 146 °C (291 to 295 °F). Combustion typically occurs above 349 °C (660 °F).

Most LDPE, MDPE, and HDPE grades have excellent chemical resistance, meaning that they are not attacked by strong acids or strong bases and are resistant to gentle oxidants and reducing agents. Crystalline samples do not dissolve at room temperature. Polyethylene (other than cross-linked polyethylene) usually can be dissolved at elevated temperatures in aromatic hydrocarbons such as toluene or xylene, or in chlorinated solvents such as trichloroethane or trichlorobenzene.

Polyethylene absorbs almost no water. The permeability for water vapor and polar gases is lower than for most plastics. On the other hand, non-polar gases such as Oxygen, carbon dioxide, and flavorings can pass it easily.

Polyethylene burns slowly with a blue flame having a yellow tip and gives off an odour of paraffin (similar to candle flame). The material continues burning on removal of the flame source and produces a drip.

Polyethylene cannot be imprinted or bonded with adhesives without pretreatment. High-strength joints are readily achieved with plastic welding. As it ages, polyethylene yellows.

=== Electrical ===
Polyethylene is a good electrical insulator. It offers good electrical treeing resistance; however, it becomes easily electrostatically charged (which can be reduced by additions of graphite, carbon black or antistatic agents). When pure, the dielectric constant is in the range 2.2 to 2.4 depending on the density and the loss tangent is very low, making it a good dielectric for building capacitors. For the same reason it is commonly used as the insulation material for high-frequency coaxial and twisted pair cables.

=== Optical ===
Depending on thermal history and film thickness, PE can vary between almost clear (transparent), milky-opaque (translucent) and opaque. LDPE has the greatest, LLDPE slightly less, and HDPE the least transparency. Transparency is reduced by crystallites if they are larger than the wavelength of visible light.

== Manufacturing process ==
=== Monomer ===
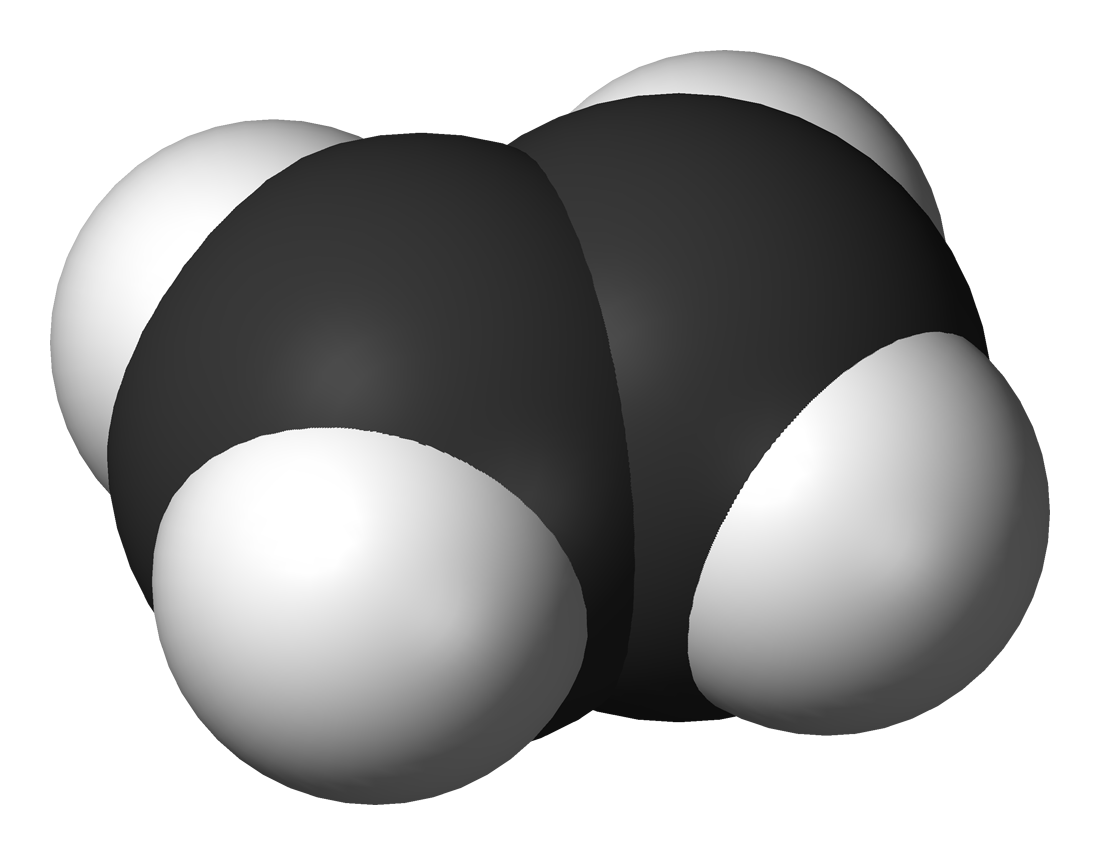
Ethylene (ethene)

The ingredient or monomer is ethylene (IUPAC name ethene), a gaseous hydrocarbon with the formula C_{2}H_{4}. Typical specifications for polymer grade ethylene are <5 ppm for water, oxygen, and other alkenes. The stringent specifications are dictated by the highly sensitive nature of most catalysts. Acceptable contaminants include N_{2}, ethane (common precursor to ethylene), and methane. Ethylene is usually produced by cracking hydrocarbons (most simply ethane). The cracking process generates small but problematic amounts of carbon dioxide, hydrogen sulfide, carbon monoxide, other alkenes, acetylene (C_{2}H_{2}), and water. The first two components are "scrubbed out" with aqueous alkali solutions. Water is then removed using molecular sieves. The "C2 stream" is purified from hydrogen and methane by cryogenic distillation in a "demethanizer" unit. The acetylene component is then hydrogenated to either ethylene (semihydrogenation) or innocuous ethane (full hydrogenation) using a palladium-silver catalyst. Next a "C2 splitter" column separates ethylene from ethane. Ethane and higher alkenes are removed in a "deethanizer" unit.

Ethylene is also generated by dehydration of ethanol and from methanol. In these cases, the purification regime differs from that used in the steam cracker.

=== Polymerization ===
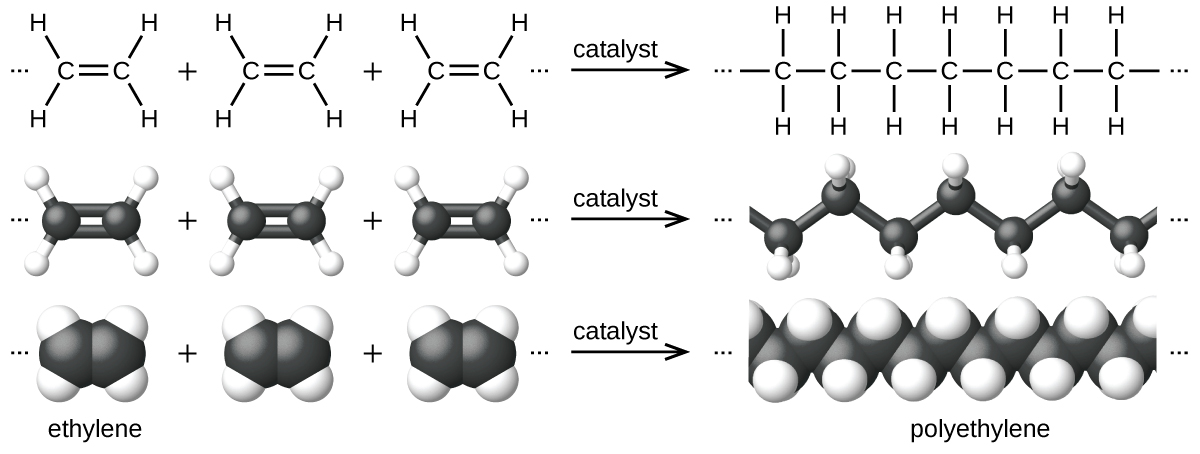

Polymerization of ethylene to polyethylene is described by the following chemical equation:

n CH_{2}=CH_{2} (gas) → [−CH_{2}−CH_{2}−]_{n} (solid) ΔH/n = −25.71 ± 0.59 kcal/mol (−107.6 ± 2.5 kJ/mol)

Although ethylene is very stable, it polymerizes readily upon contact with catalysts. Coordination polymerization is the most prevalent technology. Common catalysts consist of modifications of titanium(III) chloride, the so-called Ziegler–Natta catalysts. Another common catalyst is the Phillips catalyst, prepared by depositing chromium(VI) oxide on silica. Some soluble metal complexes are also used, e.g. Kaminsky catalysts. LDPE is produced by radical polymerization at high pressure (1000–3000 bar).

== Joining ==
Commonly used methods for joining polyethylene parts together include:

- Welding
  - Hot gas welding
  - Infrared welding
  - Laser welding
  - Ultrasonic welding
  - Heat sealing
  - Heat fusion
- Fastening
- Adhesives
  - Pressure-sensitive adhesive (PSAs)
    - Dispersion of solvent-type PSAs
  - Polyurethane contact adhesives
  - Two-part polyurethane
  - Epoxy adhesives
  - Hot-melt adhesives
  - Solvent bonding – Adhesives and solvents are rarely used as solvent bonding because polyethylene is nonpolar and has a high resistance to solvents.

Pressure-sensitive adhesives (PSA) are feasible if the surface chemistry or charge is modified with plasma activation, flame treatment, or corona treatment.

== Classification ==
Polyethylene is classified by its density and branching. Its mechanical properties depend significantly on variables such as the extent and type of branching, the crystal structure, and the molecular weight. There are several types of polyethylene:

- Ultra-high-molecular-weight polyethylene (UHMWPE)
- Ultra-low-molecular-weight polyethylene (ULMWPE or PE-WAX)
- High-molecular-weight polyethylene (HMWPE)
- High-density polyethylene (HDPE)
- High-density cross-linked polyethylene (HDXLPE)
- Cross-linked polyethylene (PEX or XLPE)
- Medium-density polyethylene (MDPE)
- Linear low-density polyethylene (LLDPE)
- Low-density polyethylene (LDPE)
- Very-low-density polyethylene (VLDPE)
- Chlorinated polyethylene (CPE)

With regard to sold volumes, the most important polyethylene grades are HDPE, LLDPE, and LDPE.

=== Ultra-high-molecular-weight (UHMWPE) ===
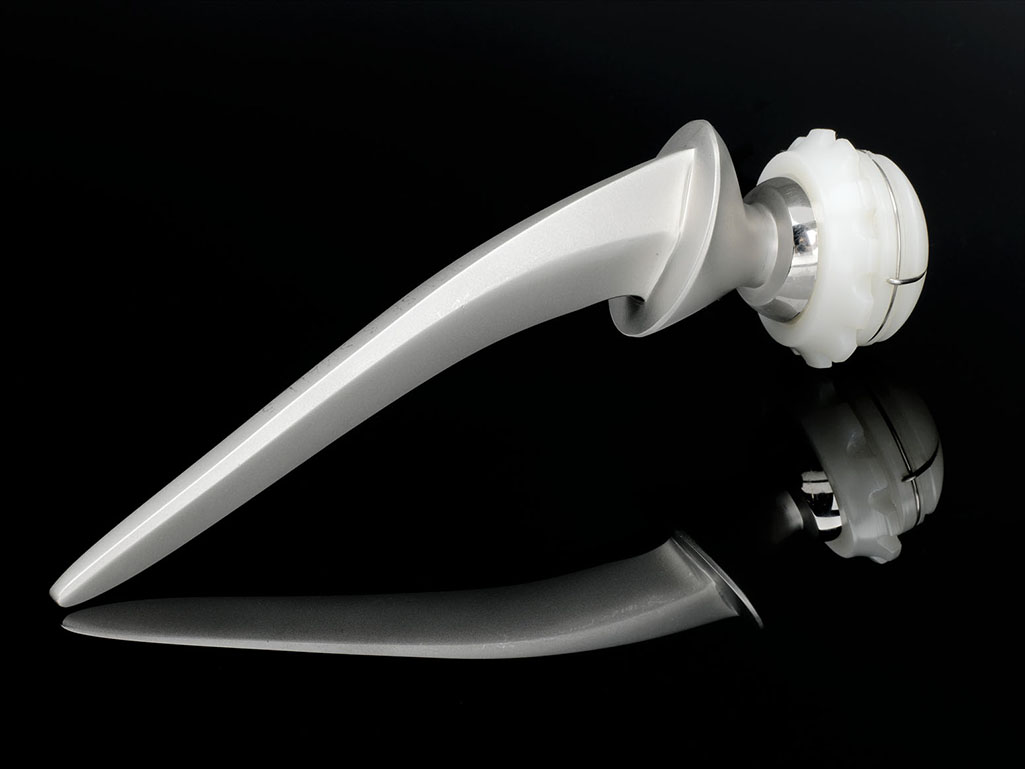
Stainless steel and ultra-high-molecular-weight polyethylene hip replacement

UHMWPE is polyethylene with a molecular weight numbering in the millions, usually between 3.5 and 7.5 million amu. Because of its high molecular weight, UHMWPE is very tough. The chains packs less efficiently as evidenced by densities of less than high-density polyethylene (for example, 0.930–0.935 g/cm^{3}). UHMWPE is made using Ziegler-Natta catalysts and soluble catalysts. Because of its outstanding toughness and its cut, wear, and excellent chemical resistance, UHMWPE is used in a diverse range of applications. These include can- and bottle-handling machine parts, moving parts on weaving machines, bearings, gears, artificial joints, edge protection on ice rinks, steel cable replacements on ships, and butchers' chopping boards. It is commonly used for the construction of articular portions of implants used for hip and knee replacements. As fiber, it competes with aramid in bulletproof vests.

=== High-density (HDPE) ===
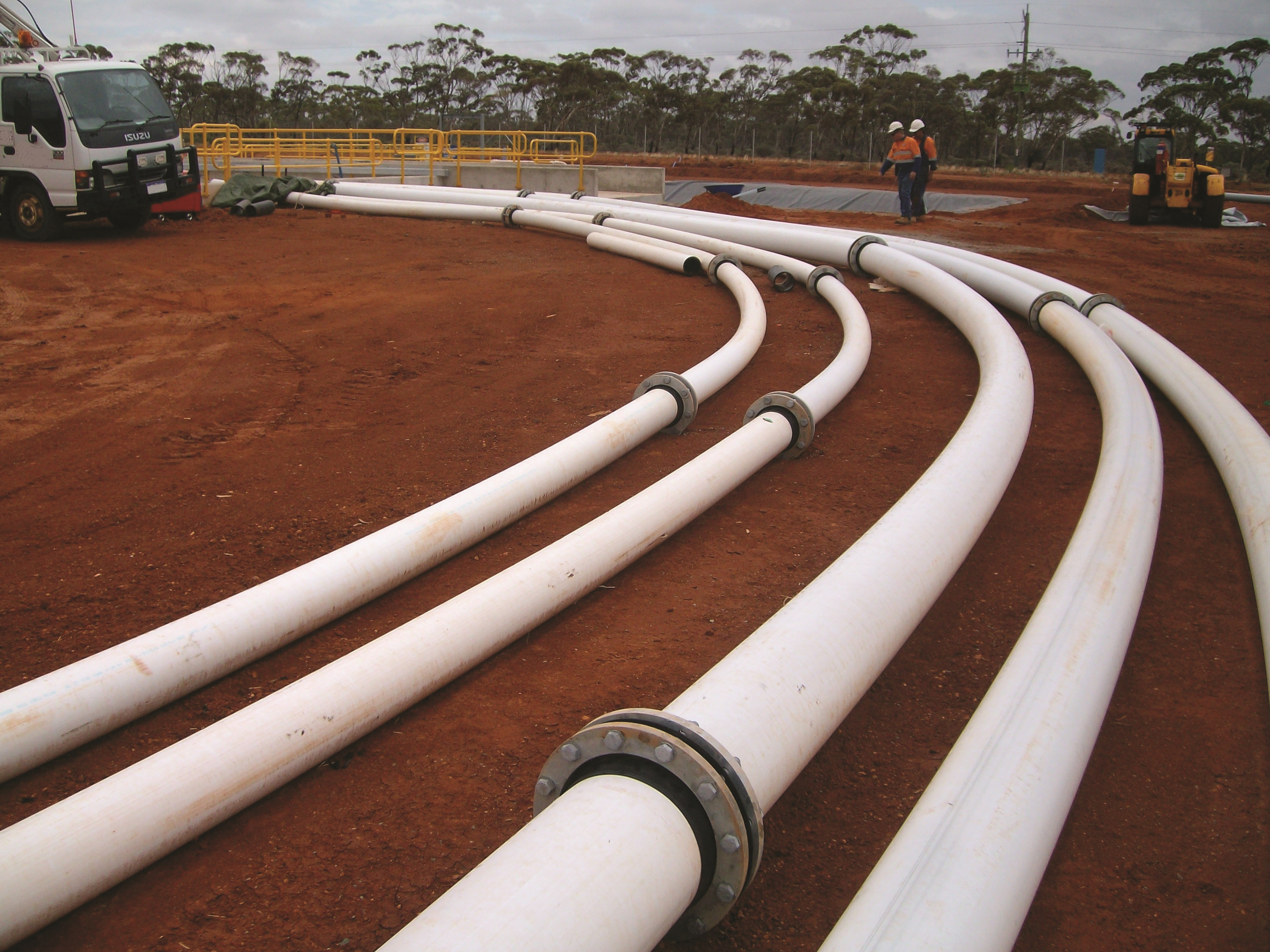
HDPE pipe on site during installation in outback Western Australia. The white outer layer, Acu-Therm, is co-extruded to provide a reduction of thermal heating.

HDPE is defined by a density of greater or equal to 0.941 g/cm^{3}. With a low degree of branching, the mostly linear molecules pack well, so intermolecular forces are stronger than in highly branched polymers. HDPE can be produced by chromium/silica catalysts, Ziegler–Natta catalysts, or metallocene catalysts. The degree of branching can be controlled by reaction conditions.

HDPE has high tensile strength. It is used in products and packaging such as milk jugs, detergent bottles, butter tubs, garbage containers, and water pipes.

=== Cross-linked (PEX or XLPE) ===
PEX is a medium- to high-density polyethylene containing cross-link bonds introduced into the polymer structure, changing the thermoplastic into a thermoset. The high-temperature properties of the polymer are improved, its flow is reduced, and its chemical resistance is enhanced. PEX is used in some potable-water plumbing systems because tubes made of the material can be expanded to fit over a metal nipple and it will slowly return to its original shape, forming a permanent, water-tight connection.

=== Medium-density (MDPE) ===
MDPE is defined by a density range of 0.926–0.940 g/cm^{3}. MDPE can be produced by chromium/silica catalysts, Ziegler–Natta catalysts, or metallocene catalysts. MDPE has good shock and drop resistance properties. It also is less notch-sensitive than HDPE; stress-cracking resistance is better than HDPE. MDPE is typically used in gas pipes and fittings, sacks, shrink film, packaging film, carrier bags, and screw closures.

=== Linear low-density (LLDPE) ===
LLDPE is defined by a density range of 0.915–0.925 g/cm^{3}. LLDPE is a substantially linear polymer with significant numbers of short branches, commonly made by copolymerization of ethylene with short-chain alpha-olefins (for example, 1-butene, 1-hexene, and 1-octene). LLDPE has higher tensile strength than LDPE, and it exhibits higher impact and puncture resistance than LDPE. Lower-thickness (gauge) films can be blown, compared with LDPE, with better environmental stress cracking resistance, but they are not as easy to process. LLDPE is used in packaging, particularly film for bags and sheets. Lower thickness may be used compared to LDPE. It is used for cable coverings, toys, lids, buckets, containers, and pipe. While other applications are available, LLDPE is used predominantly in film applications due to its toughness, flexibility, and relative transparency. Product examples range from agricultural films, Saran wrap, and bubble wrap to multilayer and composite films.

=== Low-density (LDPE) ===
LDPE is defined by a density range of 0.910–0.940 g/cm^{3}. LDPE has a high degree of short- and long-chain branching, which means that the chains do not pack into the crystal structure as well. It has, therefore, less strong intermolecular forces as the instantaneous-dipole induced-dipole attraction is less. This results in a lower tensile strength and increased ductility. LDPE is produced by free-radical polymerization. The high degree of branching with long chains gives molten LDPE unique and desirable flow properties. LDPE is used for both rigid containers and plastic film applications such as plastic bags and film wrap.

The radical polymerization process used to make LDPE does not include a catalyst that controls the radical sites on the growing chains. (In HDPE synthesis, by contrast, chain growth occurs by insertion at a metal–carbon bond.) Secondary radicals (in the middle of a chain) are more stable than primary radicals (at the chain end), and tertiary radicals (at a branch point) are more stable yet. Each time an ethylene monomer is added, it creates a primary radical, but often these will rearrange to form more stable secondary or tertiary radicals. Addition of ethylene monomers to the secondary or tertiary sites creates branching.

=== Very-low-density (VLDPE) ===
VLDPE is defined by a density range of 0.880–0.915 g/cm^{3}. VLDPE is a substantially linear polymer with high levels of short-chain branches, commonly made by copolymerization of ethylene with short-chain alpha-olefins (for example, 1-butene, 1-hexene and 1-octene). VLDPE is most commonly produced using metallocene catalysts, which more readily incorporate the comonomers. VLDPEs are used for hose and tubing, ice and frozen food bags, food packaging, and stretch wrap as well as impact modifiers when blended with other polymers.

Much research activity has focused on the nature and distribution of long chain branches in polyethylene. HDPE by contrast, contains a relatively small number of these branches, perhaps one branch per 100 to 1,000 backbone carbons, but these still can significantly affect the rheological properties of the polymer.

=== Types of polyethylenes ===
The particular material properties of "polyethylene" depend on its molecular structure. Molecular weight and crystallinity are the most significant factors; crystallinity in turn depends on molecular weight and degree of branching. The less the polymer chains are branched, and the lower the molecular weight, the higher the crystallinity of polyethylene. Crystallinity ranges from 35% (PE-LD/PE-LLD) to 80% (PE-HD). Polyethylene has a density of 1.0 g/cm^{3} in crystalline regions and 0.86 g/cm^{3} in amorphous regions. An almost linear relationship exists between density and crystallinity.

The degree of branching of the different types of polyethylene can be schematically represented as follows:

PE-HD	Schematic representation of PE-HD (high-density polyethylene)
PE-LLD	Schematic representation of PE-LLD (linear low-density polyethylene)
PE-LD	Schematic representation of PE-LD (low-density polyethylene)

The figure shows polyethylene backbones, short-chain branches and side-chain branches. The polymer chains are represented linearly.

=== Chain branches ===
The properties of polyethylene are highly dependent on type and number of chain branches. The chain branches in turn depend on the process used: either the high-pressure process (only PE-LD) or the low-pressure process (all other PE grades). Low-density polyethylene is produced by the high-pressure process by radical polymerization, thereby numerous short chain branches as well as long chain branches are formed. Short chain branches are formed by intramolecular chain transfer reactions, they are predominantly butyl or ethyl chain branches because the reaction proceeds after the following mechanism:

== Copolymers ==
=== Non-polar copolymers ===
In the low pressure process α-olefins (e.g. 1-butene or 1-hexene) may be incorporated in the polymer chain. These copolymers introduce short side chains, thus crystallinity and density are reduced. As explained above, mechanical and thermal properties are changed thereby. In particular, PE-LLD is produced this way. For "metallocene polyethylene" (PE-M), prepared using metallocene catalysts, copolymers with 1-hexene are common. PE-M has a relatively narrow molecular weight distribution, exceptionally high toughness, excellent optical properties, and a uniform comonomer content. Because of the narrow molecular weight distribution it behaves less as a pseudoplastic (especially under larger shear rates). PE-M has only a small low molecular weight (extractable) component and a low welding and sealing temperature. Thus, it is particularly suitable for the food industry.

Cyclic olefin copolymers are prepared by copolymerization of ethene and cycloolefins (usually norbornene) produced by using metallocene catalysts. The resulting polymers are amorphous and particularly transparent and heat resistant.

=== Polyethylene with multimodal molecular weight distribution ===
Polyethylene with multimodal molecular weight distribution consists of several polymer fractions, which are mixed. Such polyethylene types offer extremely high stiffness, toughness, strength, stress crack resistance and an increased crack propagation resistance. They consist of equal proportions higher and lower molecular polymer fractions. The lower molecular weight units crystallize easier and relax faster. The higher molecular weight fractions form linking molecules between crystallites, thereby increasing toughness and stress crack resistance. Polyethylene with multimodal molecular weight distribution can be prepared either in two-stage reactors, by catalysts with two active centers on a carrier or by blending in extruders.

=== Polar ethylene copolymers ===
Ethylene/vinyl alcohol copolymer (EVOH) is (formally) a copolymer of PE and vinyl alcohol. This material is prepared by (partial) hydrolysis of ethylene-vinyl acetate copolymer. However, typically EVOH has a higher comonomer content than the VAC commonly used. EVOH is used in multilayer films for packaging as a barrier layer (barrier plastic). As EVOH is hygroscopic (water-attracting), it absorbs water from the environment, whereby it loses its barrier effect. Therefore, it must be used as a core layer surrounded by other plastics (like LDPE, PP, PA or PET). EVOH is also used as an anticorrosion coating on street lights, traffic light poles, and noise protection walls.

The copolymer of ethylene and unsaturated carboxylic acids (such as acrylic acid) show good adhesion to diverse materials. They resist stress cracking and exhibit high flexibility. Salts formed by deprotonation of ethylene-acrylic acid copolymers (and related materials) are ionomers. In addition to their good adhesion to metals, they exhibit high abrasion resistance and high water absorption.

Ethylene-vinyl acetate copolymers are prepared similarly to LD-PE by high pressure polymerization. The proportion of comonomer has a decisive influence on the behaviour of the polymer. With a very high proportion of comonomers (about 50%) rubbery thermoplastics are produced (thermoplastic elastomers). Ethylene-ethyl acrylate copolymers behave similarly to ethylene-vinyl acetate copolymers.

== Reactions of polyethylene ==
=== Crosslinking ===
A basic distinction is made between peroxide crosslinking (PE-Xa), silane crosslinking (PE-Xb), electron beam crosslinking (PE-Xc) and azo crosslinking (PE-Xd).

Shown are the peroxide, the silane and irradiation crosslinking. In each method, a radical is generated in the polyethylene chain (top center), either by radiation (h·ν) or by peroxides (R-O-O-R). Then, two radical chains can either directly crosslink (bottom left) or indirectly by silane compounds (bottom right).

- Peroxide crosslinking (PE-Xa): The crosslinking of polyethylene using peroxides (e. g. dicumyl or di-tert-butyl peroxide) is still of major importance. In the so-called Engel process, a mixture of HDPE and 2% peroxide, mixed at low temperatures in an extruder, is crosslinked at high temperatures (between 200 and 250 °C). The peroxide decomposes to peroxide radicals (RO•), which abstract (remove) hydrogen atoms from the polymer chain, leading to radicals. When these radicals combine, a crosslinked network is formed. The resulting polymer network is uniform, of low tension and high flexibility, whereby it is softer and tougher than (the irradiated) PE-Xc.
- Silane crosslinking (PE-Xb): In the presence of silanes (e.g. trimethoxyvinylsilane) polyethylene can initially be Si-functionalized by irradiation or by addition of a small amount of a peroxide. Later Si-OH (silanol) functionality can be introduced by hydrolysis of the Si-OCH_{3} groups. The silanols condense, crosslinking the PE by formation of Si-O-Si bridges. Catalysts such as dibutyltin dilaurate are sometimes used to accelerate the hydrolysis/crosslining.
- Irradiation crosslinking (PE-Xc): The crosslinking of polyethylene is also possible by a downstream radiation source (usually an electron accelerator, occasionally an isotopic radiator). PE products are crosslinked below the crystalline melting point by splitting off hydrogen atoms. β-radiation possesses a penetration depth of 10 mm, ɣ-radiation 100 mm. Thereby the interior or specific areas can be excluded from the crosslinking. However, due to high capital and operating costs radiation crosslinking plays only a minor role compared with the peroxide crosslinking. In contrast to peroxide crosslinking, the process is carried out in the solid state. Thereby, the cross-linking takes place primarily in the amorphous regions, while the crystallinity remains largely intact.
- Azo crosslinking (PE-Xd): In the so-called Lubonyl process polyethylene is crosslinked preadded azo compounds after extrusion in a hot salt bath.

=== Chlorination and sulfochlorination ===
Chlorinated Polyethylene (PE-C) is an inexpensive material having a chlorine content from 34 to 44%. It is used in blends with PVC because the soft, rubbery chloropolyethylene is embedded in the PVC matrix, thereby increasing the impact resistance. It also increases the weather resistance. Furthermore, it is used for softening PVC foils, without inducing migration of plasticizers. Chlorinated polyethylene can be crosslinked using peroxides to form elastomers, which are used in cable and rubber industry. When chlorinated polyethylene is added to other polyolefins, it reduces the flammability.

Chlorosulfonated PE (CSM) is used as starting material for ozone-resistant synthetic rubber.

=== Bio-based polyethylene ===
Braskem and Toyota Tsusho Corporation started joint marketing activities to produce polyethylene from sugarcane. Braskem will build a new facility at their existing industrial unit in Triunfo, Rio Grande do Sul, Brazil with an annual production capacity of 200,000 short tons (180,000,000 kg), and will produce high-density and low-density polyethylene from bioethanol derived from sugarcane.

== Environmental issues ==
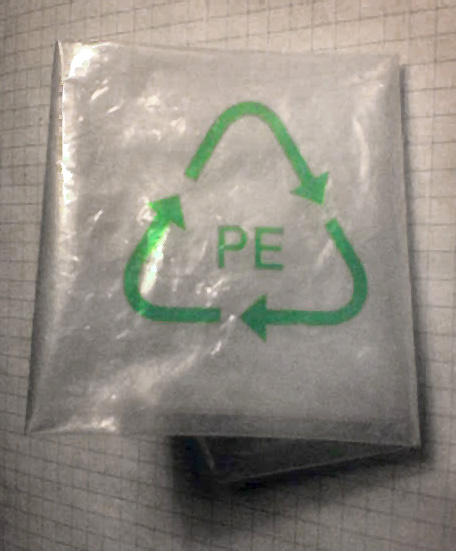
A recyclable bag manufactured from polyethylene, resin identification code

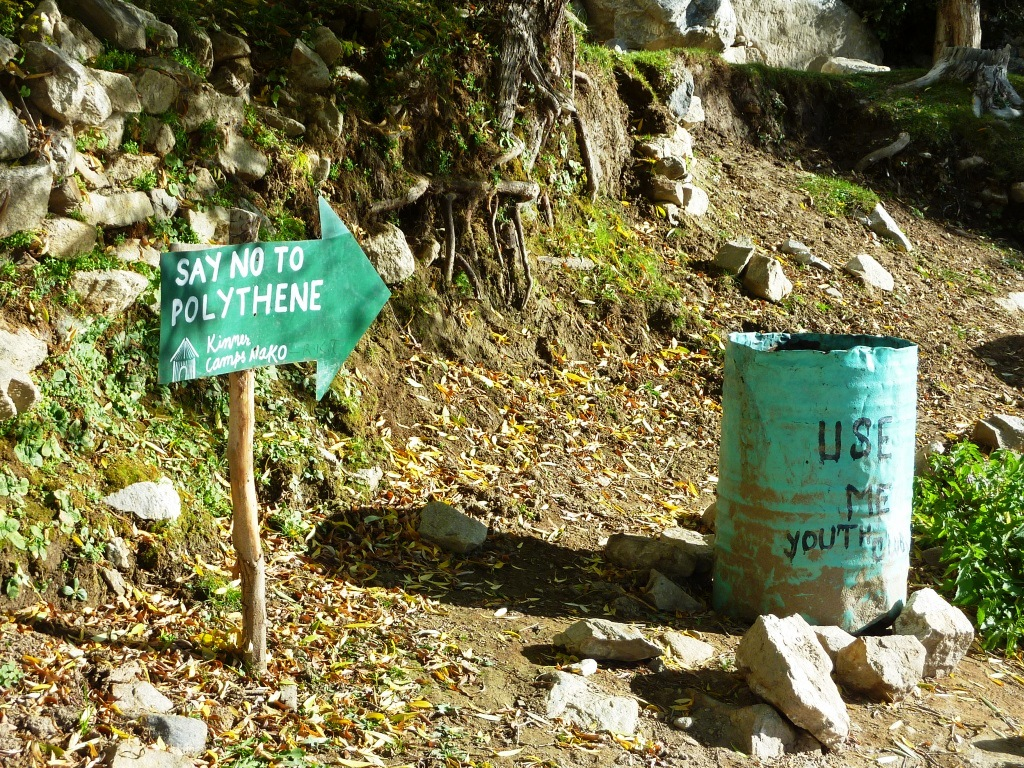
Say no to polythene. Sign. Nako, Himachal Pradesh, India.

The widespread usage of polyethylene poses potential difficulties for waste management because it is not readily biodegradable.

=== Biodegradability ===
Several experiments have been conducted aimed at discovering an enzyme or organisms that will degrade polyethylene. Several plastics - such as polyesters, polycarbonates, and polyamides - degrade either by hydrolysis or air oxidation. In some such cases the degradation is accelerated by bacteria or various enzyme cocktails. The situation is very different with polymers where the backbone consists solely of C-C bonds. These polymers include polyethylene, but also polypropylene, polystyrene and acrylates. At best, these polymers degrade very slowly. Further confusing the situation, even preliminary successes are greeted with enthusiasm by the popular press.

=== Bacteria and insect case studies ===
Indian mealmoth larvae are claimed to metabolize polyethylene. The guts of the Plodia interpunctella moth larvae metabolize polyethylene, lowering its tensile strength by 50%, its mass by 10% and the molecular weight by 13%.

The caterpillar of Galleria mellonella is also claimed to consume polyethylene. The caterpillar is able to digest polyethylene due to a combination of its gut microbiota and its saliva containing enzymes that oxidise and depolymerise the plastic.

== Nomenclature and general description of the process ==
The name polyethylene comes from the ingredient and not the resulting chemical compound, which contains no double bonds. The scientific name polyethene is systematically derived from the scientific name of the monomer. The alkene monomer converts to a long, sometimes very long, alkane in the polymerization process. In certain circumstances it is useful to use a structure-based nomenclature; in such cases IUPAC recommends poly(methylene) (poly(methanediyl) is a non-preferred alternative). The difference in names between the two systems is due to the opening up of the monomer's double bond upon polymerization. The name is abbreviated to PE. In a similar manner polypropylene and polystyrene are shortened to PP and PS, respectively. In the United Kingdom and India the polymer is commonly called polythene, from the ICI trade name, although this is not recognized scientifically.

== Bibliography ==
- Piringer, Otto G.; Baner, Albert Lawrence (2008). Plastic Packaging: Interactions with Food and Pharmaceuticals (2nd ed.). Wiley-VCH. ISBN 978-3-527-31455-3.
- Plastics Design Library (1997). Handbook of Plastics Joining: A Practical Guide (illustrated ed.). William Andrew. ISBN 978-1-884207-17-4.
