= Wham-O =

American toy company

Wham-O Toys Inc.
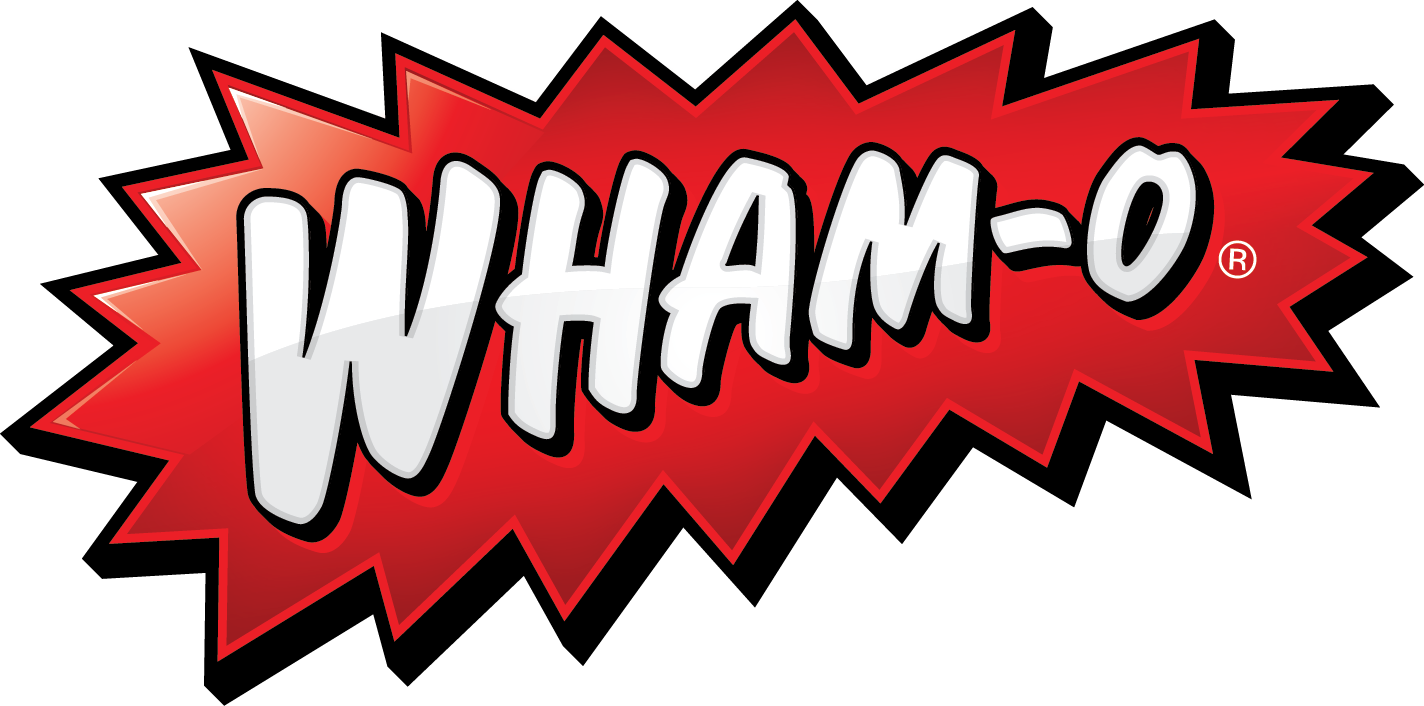

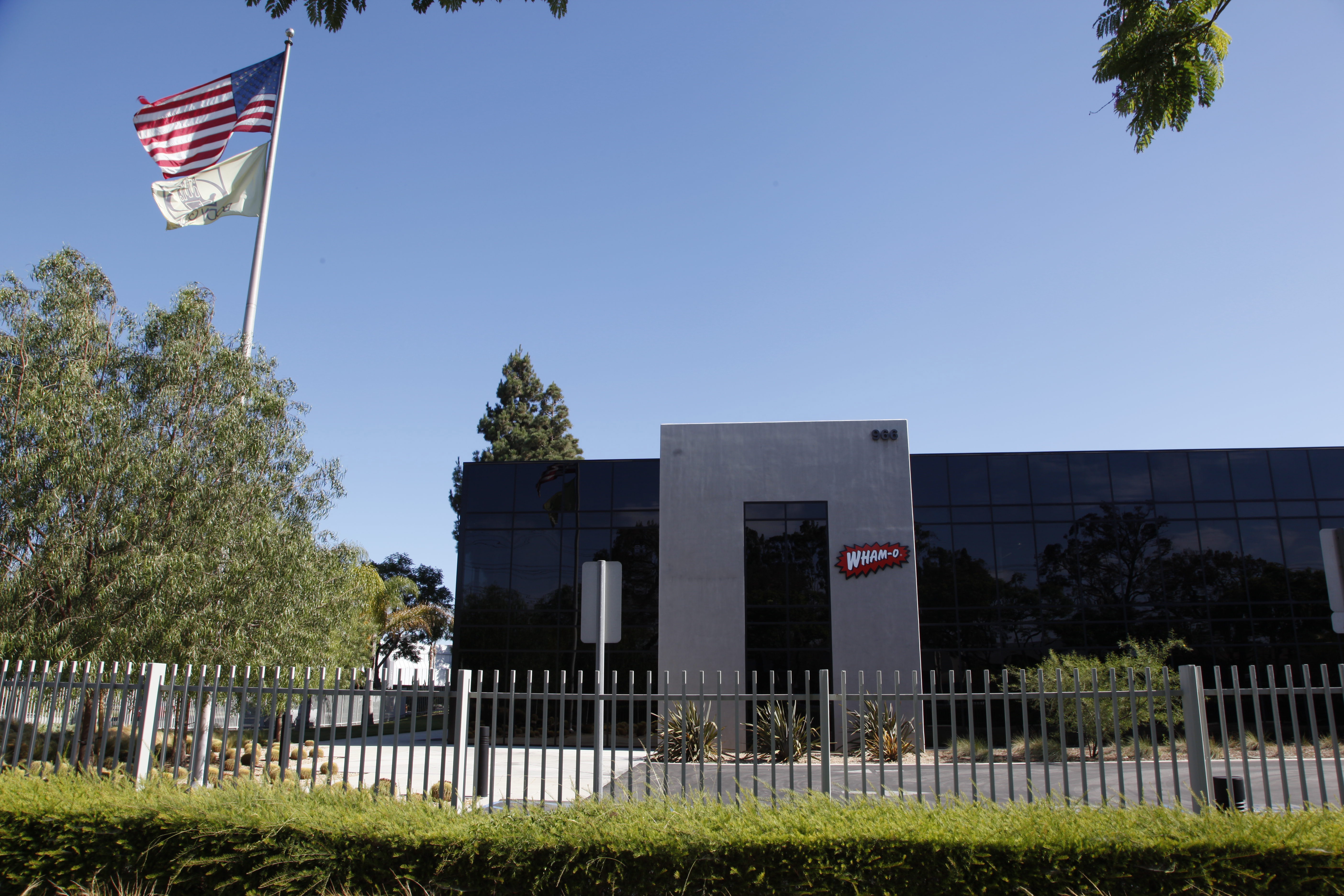
- Wham-O headquarters in Carson, California
- Type: Private
- Industry: Toys
- Founded: 1948; 78 years ago
- Founder: Richard Knerr and Arthur "Spud" Melin
- Headquarters: Carson, California, U.S.
- Website: wham-o.com

Wham-O Inc. is an American toy company based in Carson, California, United States. Founded in 1948, it is known for creating and marketing many popular toys, including the Hula hoop, Frisbee, Slip 'N Slide, Super Ball, Trac-Ball, Silly String, Hacky Sack, Wham-O Bird Ornithopter, and Boogie Board, many of which have become genericized trademarks.

== Corporate history ==
Richard Knerr (1925–2008) and Arthur "Spud" Melin (1924–2002), two University of Southern California graduates who were friends since their teens, were unhappy with their jobs and decided to start their own business. In 1948, they formed the WHAM-O Manufacturing Company in the Knerr family garage in South Pasadena. Their first product was the Wham-O Slingshot, made of ash wood, which Knerr and Melin promoted by holding demonstrations of their own slingshot skills. The name "Wham-O" was inspired by the sound of the slingshot's shot hitting the target. The powerful slingshot was adopted by clubs for competitive target shooting and small game hunting. When they outgrew the garage, Knerr and Melin rented a building on S. Marengo Ave in Alhambra, California. In 1955, they moved their manufacturing plant to neighboring San Gabriel, California, where they remained until 1987, when they sold the plant to Huy Fong Foods.

== Products and marketing ==
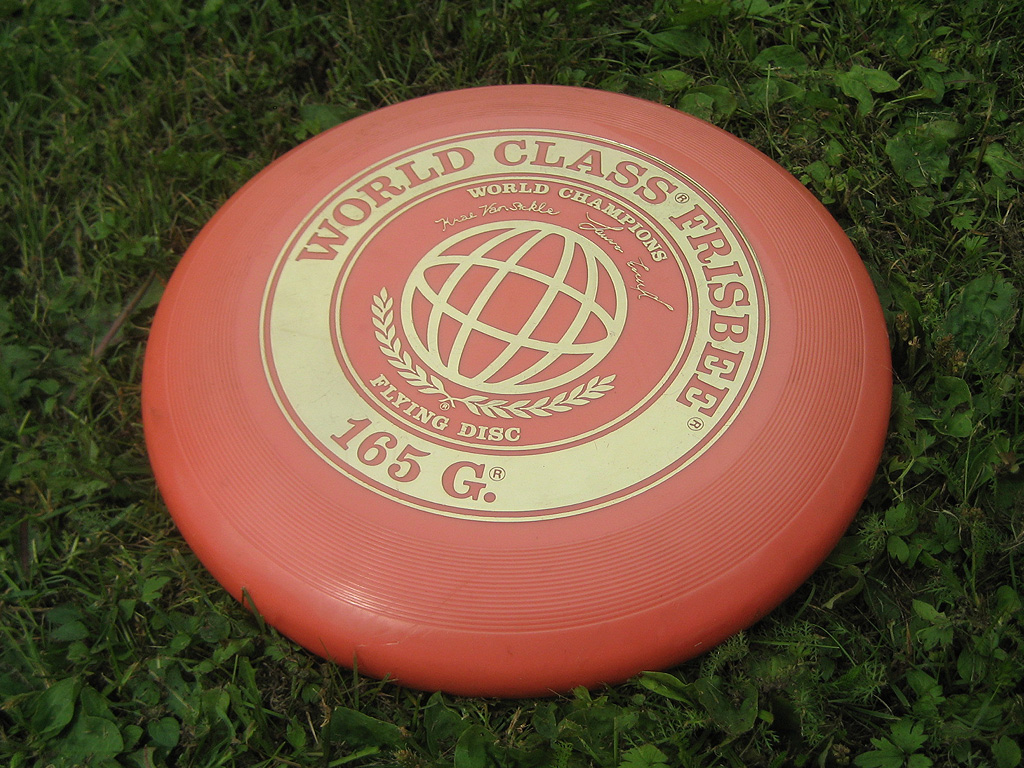
A Frisbee made by Wham-O

In 1958, Wham-O, still a fledgling company, took the idea of Australian bamboo "exercise hoops", manufactured them in Marlex, and called their new product the Hula Hoop. The name had been used since the 18th century, but until then was not registered as a trademark. It became the biggest toy fad in modern history. 25 million were sold in four months, and in two years sales reached more than 100 million. "Hula Hoop mania" continued through the end of 1959, and netted Wham-O $45 million (equivalent to $497 million in 2025).

Shortly thereafter, the company had another huge success with the Frisbee. In 1955, inventor Fred Morrison began marketing a plastic flying disc called the Pluto Platter. He sold the design to Wham-O on January 23, 1957. By June they had learned that students back east were calling them a "Frisbee." In early 1958, Wham-O added the name "Frisbee" to the top of the Pluto Platter – and once again a Wham-O toy became a common part of life through the 1960s.

In the early 1960s, Wham-O created the Super Ball, a high-bouncing ball made of a hard elastomer Polybutadiene alloy, dubbed Zectron, with a 0.92 coefficient of restitution when bounced on hard surfaces. Around 20 million Super Balls were sold that decade, and the NFL named the Super Bowl games after it.

The Frisbee and Hula Hoop created fads. With other products, Wham-O tried to capitalize on existing national trends. In the 1960s, they produced a US$119 do-it-yourself bomb shelter cover. In 1962, they sold a limbo dance kit to take advantage of that fad; and in 1975, when the movie Jaws was released, they sold plastic shark teeth.

Many products were not successful. During an African safari in the early 1960s, Melin discovered a species of fish that laid eggs in the mud during Africa's dry season. When the rains came, the eggs hatched and fish emerged overnight. This inspired Melin to create the Instant Fish product, an aquarium kit consisting of some of the fish eggs, and some mud in which to hatch them.

== Other products ==
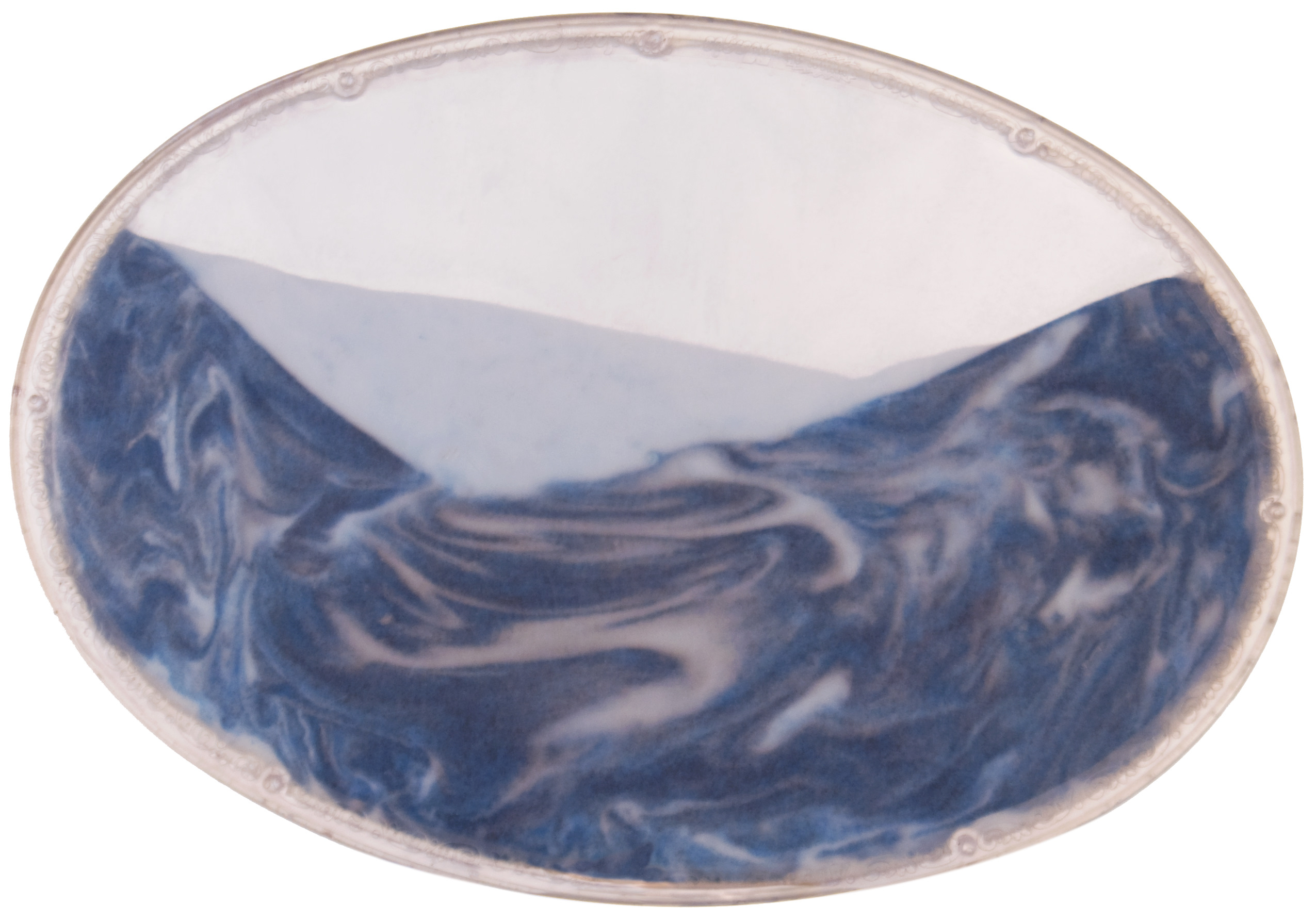
Vintage Blue and white Wham-O Magic Window toy from the 1970s

- Wham-O Bird Ornithopter (1959) sold in a large cardboard box, ready to fly. Made of aluminum spars, wood, steel wire and mylar, it was brightly painted to resemble a hawk or owl. The retail price for the rubber-band-powered toy was $3 (equivalent to $30.65 in 2025). About 600,000 were made.
- Wheelie Bar (1966) for wheelie bikes, especially well suited for the popular Schwinn Sting-Ray. The packaging design, featuring 1960s character Rat Fink, was widely reproduced on T-shirts, posters and decals. The television commercial featured Kathryn Minner, the original Little Old Lady from Pasadena.
- Air Blaster (1965), which shot a puff of air that could blow out a candle at 20 feet
- Bubble Thing (1988), a flexible plastic strip attached to a wand, which was dipped in soap solution and waved through the air to create giant soap bubbles. Ads claimed it could make bubbles "as long as a bus".
- Huf'n Puf blowgun that shot soft rubber darts
- Real (non-toy) crossbows, machetes, boomerangs and throwing knives
- Powermaster .22 caliber single-shot target pistol, sold by mail order (1956), and several other .22 caliber weapons
- Slip 'N Slide (1961), a carpet-like, water-lubricated sliding surface
- Water Wiggle (1962), a plastic-enclosed curved nozzle that, when powered by a garden hose, became airborne. Recalled in 1978 after it caused the deaths of two children, having sold approximately 2.5 million units.
- Monster Magnet (1964)
- Super Sneaky Squirtin' Stick (1964)
- Willie (1964), a furry toy snake
- Super Stuff (1966)
- Turbo Tube (1966)
- Giant Comics (1967)
- Silly String (1969)
- Super Elastic Bubble Plastic (1970)
- Magic Window (1971), two 30 by 30 centimetres (12 in × 12 in) oval plates of heavy clear plastic, with a narrow channel between them containing "microdium" (glass) crystal sands of varying colors that created complex patterns when shifted.)
- Trac-Ball
- Magic sand (1980), sand coated with a hydrophobic material that caused water to bead off of it rather than being absorbed
- Roller Racer Sit Skate (1983)
- Hacky Sack, a footbag design purchased from its inventors in 1983
- Splatter Up (1990s)
- EZ SPIN Foam Frisbee Disc (2008), a soft version of the Frisbee that could be used indoors

== Strategy ==
Knerr and Melin marketed their products directly to children, including demonstrating their toys at playgrounds. They extensively researched new product ideas, including traveling around the world. "If Spud and I had to say what we contributed," Knerr said, "it was fun. But I think this country gave us more than we gave it. It gave us the opportunity to do it."

For many years, the company's strategy was to maintain eight to twelve simple, inexpensive products such as Frisbees, Super Balls, and Hula Hoops. New products were developed for tryout periods. Old ones were retired, for a few years or permanently, as their popularity waned. Since the toys were simple and inexpensive, they could be sold by a wide range of retailers, from large Department Stores to five and dime stores.

As Wham-O changed ownership, its new management adjusted this formula to accommodate the changing toy industry, which had increasingly complex toys and fewer distribution channels.

By 2006 Wham-O's product line included several groups of related items using licensed brand names. For example, Sea-Doo is a brand of personal water craft owned by Bombardier; Wham-O makes a Sea-Doo line of small inflatable rafts designed to be towed behind watercraft.

The company's lines are also more complex, and grouped in related categories—for example, the Sea-Doo line (about a dozen products), several Slip 'N Slide variations, and a group of "lawn games".

On January 31, 2011, Wham-O announced an agreement with ICM, the agency representing Atari video games, to represent Wham-O in movies, television, music, and online content based around its toys.

== Company timeline ==
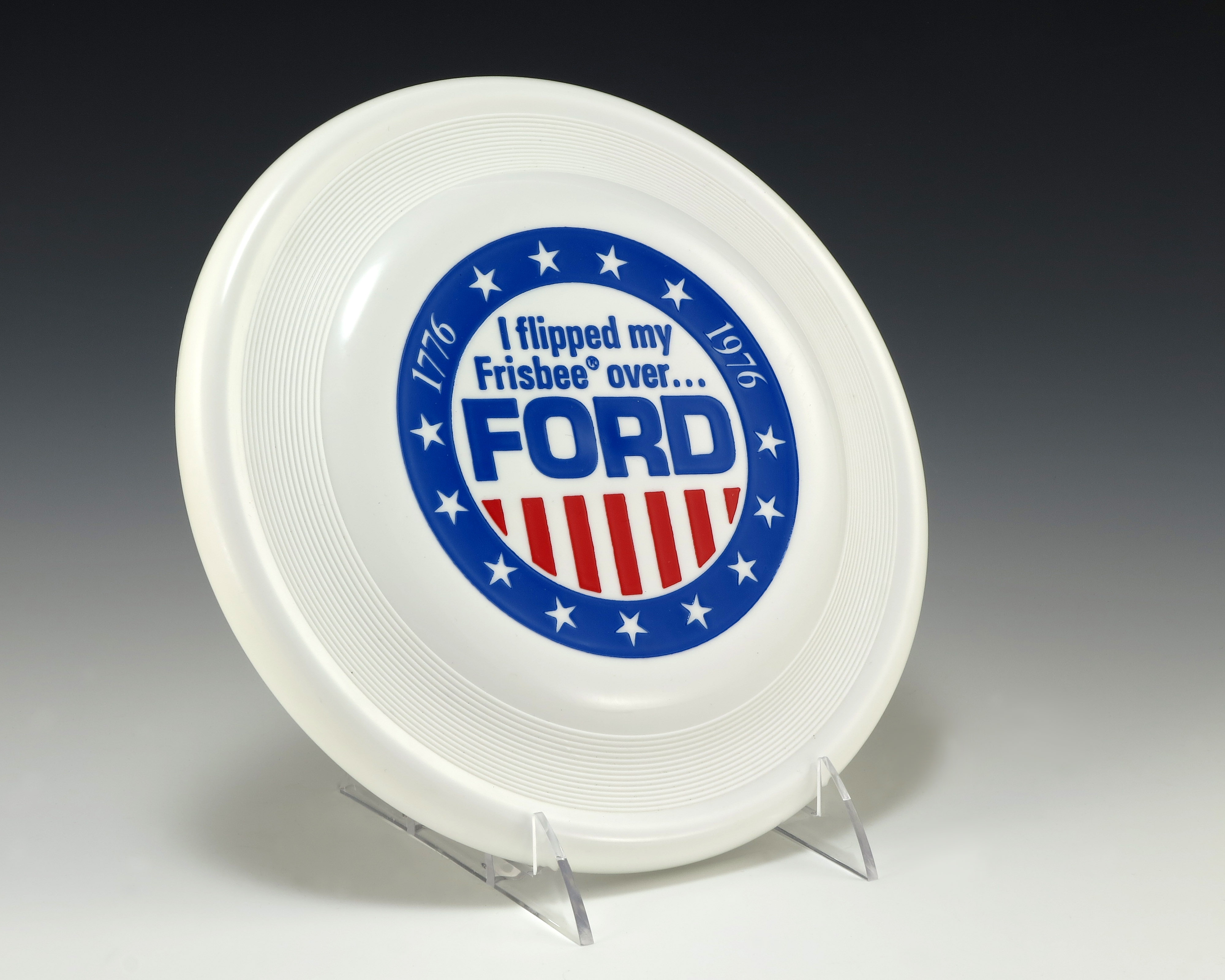
Frisbee political campaign advertisement designed by San Francisco-based advertising executive Bob Gardner of Gardner Communications as part of U.S. President Gerald Ford's 1976 advertising team and given to Ford at the 1976 Republican National Convention. At the time, Gardner's company also held the Frisbee advertising account.

- 1948: WHAM-O founded. For about a year in the 1950s, the company markets their sporting goods under the name WAMO.
- 1957: WHAM-O acquires the rights to the Pluto Platter from Fred Morrison and renames it Frisbee.
- 1958: Hula Hoop introduced
- 1958: Frisbee sales improve
- 1961: Slip 'N' Slide introduced
- 1965: Super Ball introduced
- 1982: Wham-O purchased by Kransco Group Companies
- 1994: Mattel buys Wham-O from Kransco
- 1995: Wham-O buys Aspectus.
- 1997: Wham-O becomes independent again when an investment group purchases it from Mattel
- 2002: Founder Arthur "Spud" Melin dies
- January 2006: Wham-O is sold for ~ US$80 million to Cornerstone Overseas Investment Limited, a Chinese company that owns or controls five factories in China. The same month, Wham-O donated the office files, photographs and films of Dan "Stork" Roddick, Wham-O's director of sports promotion from 1975 to 1994, to the Western Historical Manuscript Collection.
- 2008: Founder Richard Knerr dies
- 2008: Wham-O introduces the EZ Spin Foam Frisbee Disc, a soft foam version of the Frisbee
- 2009: Wham-O sold to investment firm The Aguilar Group
- 2010: Wham-O acquires Sprig Toys Inc.
- 2018: Wham-O partners with Smacircle LMT ltd. to introduce Smacircle S1, an e-bike.
