= Knerr =

Knerr is a surname. Notable people with the surname include:

- Harold Knerr (1882–1949), American comic strip creator
- Hugh J. Knerr (1887–1971), major general in the United States Air Force
- Lou Knerr (1921–1980), baseball player
- Otto Knerr (1883–1960), American gymnast
- Richard Knerr (1925–2008), American inventor
