= Demolition ball =

Demolition ball may refer to:

- Whirlyball
- A wrecking ball
