= Super Ball =

Bouncy ball made by Wham-O

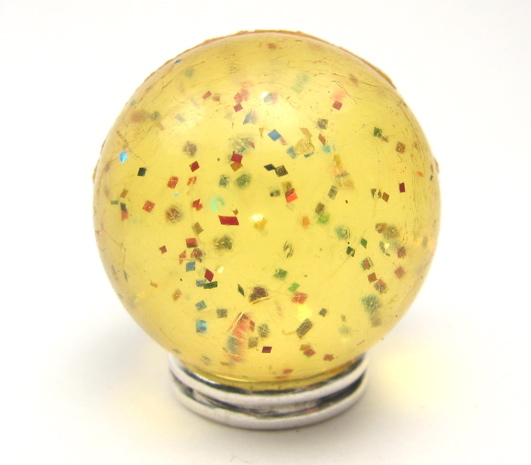
A Super Ball containing particles of glitter, resting on a bespoke base. The translucent rubber has yellowed with age.

A Super Ball or Superball is a toy bouncy ball based on a type of synthetic rubber invented in 1964 by chemist Norman Stingley. It is an extremely elastic ball made of Zectron, which contains the synthetic polymer polybutadiene as well as hydrated silica, zinc oxide, stearic acid, and other ingredients. This compound is vulcanized with sulfur at a temperature of 165 °C (329 °F) and formed at a pressure of 3,500 psi (24 MPa). The resulting Super Ball has a very high coefficient of restitution, and if dropped from shoulder level on a hard surface, a Super Ball bounces nearly all the way back; thrown down onto a hard surface by an average adult, it can fly over a three-story building.

== History ==
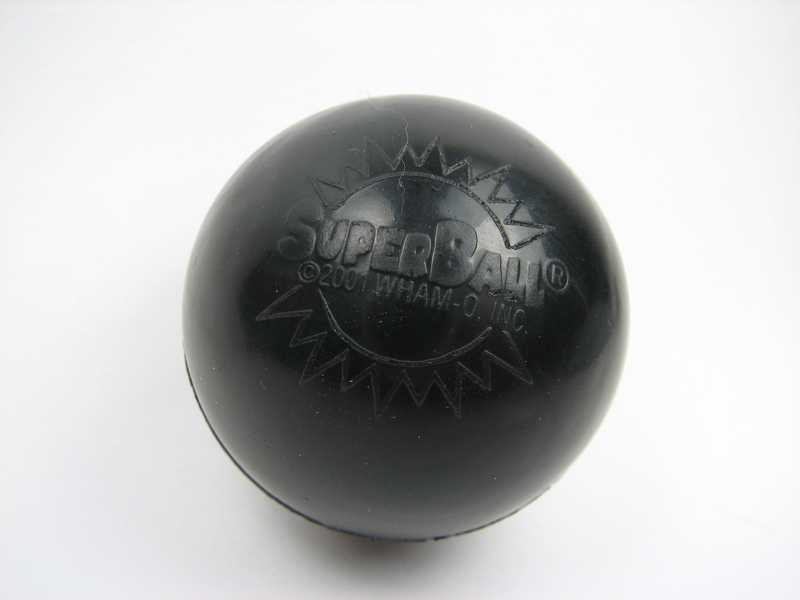
A branded Wham-O Super Ball from 2001

Stingley sought uses for his polybutadiene synthetic rubber, as well as someone to manufacture it. He first offered his invention to the Bettis Rubber Company, for whom he worked at the time, but they turned it down because the material was not very durable. So Stingley took it to toy company Wham-O; they worked on developing a more durable version which they still manufacture today.

"It took us nearly two years to iron the kinks out of Super Ball before we produced it," said Richard Knerr, President of Wham-O in 1966. "It always had that marvelous springiness.... But it had a tendency to fly apart. We've licked that with a very high-pressure technique for forming it. Now we're selling millions."

Super Ball became a fad when it was introduced. Peak production reached over 170,000 Super Balls per day. By December 1965, over six million had been sold, and U.S. presidential adviser McGeorge Bundy had five dozen shipped to the White House for the amusement of the staff. Wham-O executive vice-president Richard P. Knerr knew that fads are short-lived. "Each Super Ball bounce is 92% as high as the last," he once said. "If our sales don't come down any faster than that, we've got it made." Initially, the full-sized Super Ball sold for 98¢ at retail, equivalent to $10.01 in 2025; by the end of 1966, its colorful miniature versions sold for as little as 10¢—equivalent to $0.99 in 2025—in vending machines.

In the late 1960s, Wham-O made a giant Super Ball roughly the size of a bowling ball as a promotional stunt. It fell from the 23rd story window (some reports say the roof) of an Australian hotel and destroyed a parked convertible car on the second bounce.

Composer Alcides Lanza purchased several Super Balls in 1965 as toys for his son, but soon he started experimenting with the sounds that they made when rubbed along the strings of a piano. This resulted in his composition Plectros III (1971), in which he specifies that the performer should use a pair of Super Balls on sticks as mallets with which to strike and rub the strings and case of a piano.

Lamar Hunt, founder of the American Football League (AFL) and owner of the Kansas City Chiefs, watched his children play with a Super Ball and then coined the term Super Bowl. He wrote a letter to National Football League (NFL) commissioner Pete Rozelle dated July 25, 1966: "I have kiddingly called it the 'Super Bowl,' which obviously can be improved upon." The league's franchise owners had decided on the name AFL–NFL World Championship Game, but the media immediately picked up on Hunt's Super Bowl name, which became official beginning with the third annual game in 1969.

== Physical properties ==
According to one study, "If a pen is stuck in a hard rubber ball and dropped from a certain height, the pen may bounce to several times that height." If a Super Ball is dropped without spin onto a hard surface, with a small ball bearing on top of the Super Ball, the bearing rebounds to a great height.

High school physics teachers use Super Balls to educate students on usual and unusual models of impacts.

The "rough" nature of a Super Ball makes its impact characteristics different from those of otherwise similar smooth balls. The resulting behavior is quite complex. The Super Ball has been used as an illustration of the principle of time reversal invariance.

A Super Ball is observed to reverse the direction of spin on each bounce. This effect depends on the tangential compliance and frictional effect in the collision. It cannot be explained by rigid body impact theory, and would not occur were the ball perfectly rigid. Tangential compliance is the degree to which one body clings to rather than slips over another at the point of impact.

== Patent ==
- Stingley, Norman H. – "Highly Resilient Polybutadiene Ball";

== See also ==
- The Absent-Minded Professor
- Happy Fun Ball
