= Hula hoop =

Toy hoop that is twirled around the waist, limbs or neck

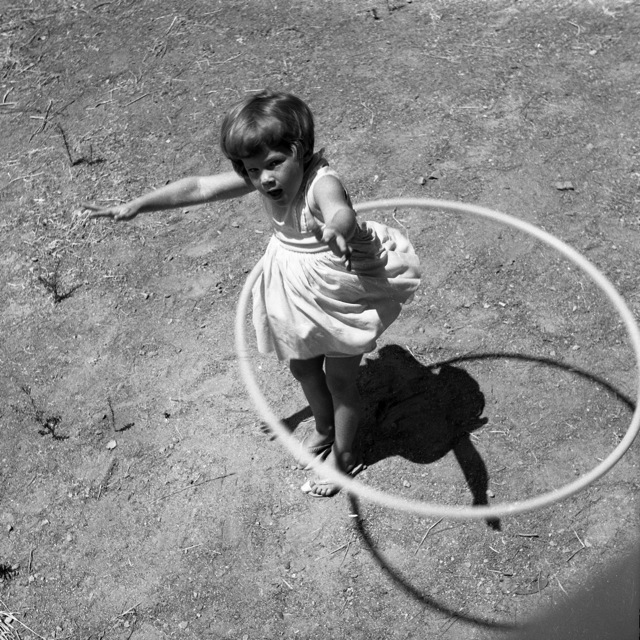
- A girl twirling a hula hoop, 1958
- Type: toy
- Company: various
- Country: various
- Availability: Ancient times–present
- Materials: various

Video of a woman hula hooping in Times Square, New York

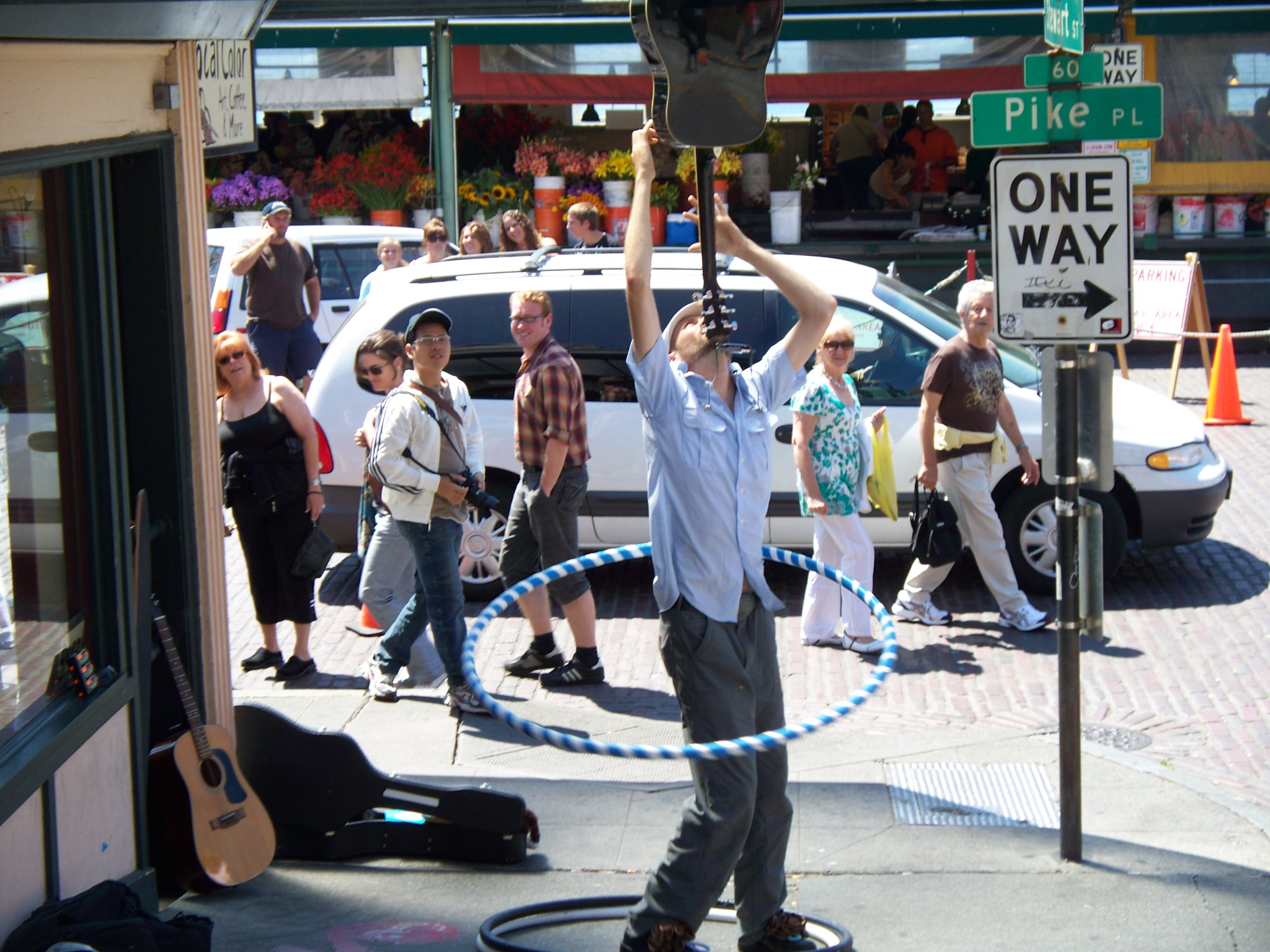
A hoop busker balancing a guitar and hula hoop at the Pike Place Market in Seattle

A new circus hula hoop performer using glow stick and LED technologies

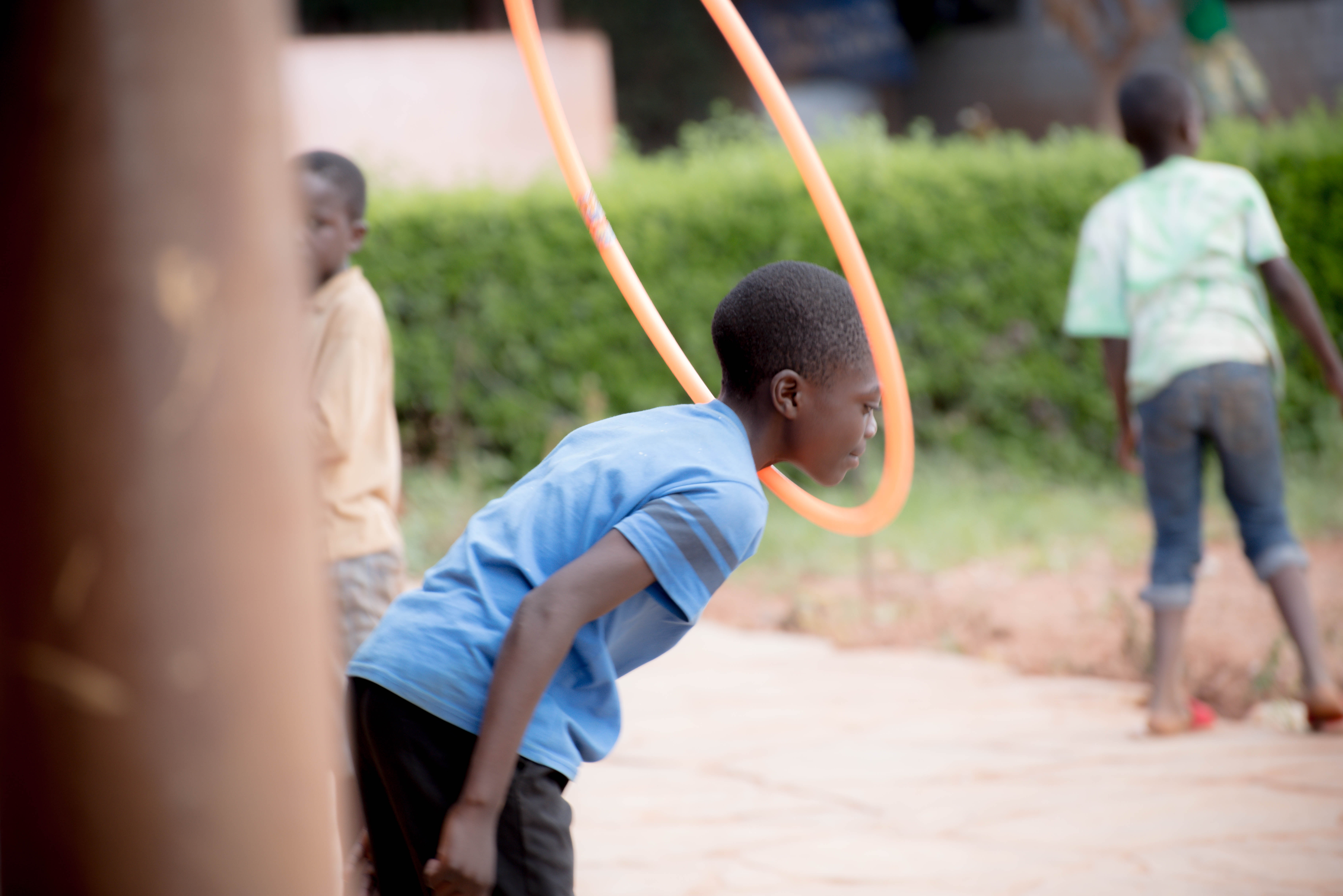
A boy hula hooping using his neck in Lusaka

A hula hoop is a toy hoop that is twirled around the waist, limbs or neck. Hoops can also be used for hoop rolling, wheeled along the ground like a wheel with careful execution and practice. They have been used by children and adults since at least 500 BC. The modern hula hoop was inspired by Australian bamboo hoops. Joan Anderson witnessed Australian children playing with bamboo hoops while driving past in an automobile, naming it "hula hoop" after the Hawaiian hula dance and introducing it to the Wham-O toy company, who popularized the plastic version in 1958 and helped it become a fad.

Hula hoops for children generally measure approximately 70 centimetres (28 in) in diameter, while those for adults measure around 100 centimetres (39 in). Traditional materials for hula hoops include willow, rattan (a flexible and strong vine), grapevines and stiff grasses. Commercial hoops are usually made of plastic tubing.

== Origins ==
Native American Hoop Dance is a form of storytelling dance incorporating hoops as props. These props are used to create both static and dynamic shapes, which represent various animals, symbols, and storytelling elements. The dance is generally performed by a solo dancer with multiple hoops.

Before it was known and recognized as the common colorful plastic toy (sometimes filled with water or sand), the traditional "hula hoop" was made of dried willow, rattan, grapevines, or stiff grasses. Though they have been in existence for thousands of years, it is often incorrectly believed that they were invented in the 1950s.

Author Charles Panati records a "craze" with the usage of wooden and metal hoops in 14th-century England. He reports that doctors treated patients who suffered pain, dislocated backs, and even heart failure from hooping. Panati also says that the name "hula" came from the Hawaiian dance in the 18th century, due to the similar hip movements.

Hamleys, the world's oldest toy store, sold hula hoops when it opened its original shop in London in 1760.

== Modern history ==
The hula hoop gained international popularity in the late 1950s, when a plastic version was successfully marketed by California's Wham-O toy company. Cane hoops had been popular children's toys to be rolled on the ground and kept balanced for as long as possible. In 1957, children in the Norwegian town of Steinkjer began a fad described in the English press as "rock-rings", with the description being "These are huge cane rings which little girls swing round their bodies by moving their hips and arms." An August 7 news item described the origin as children buying cane rings after seeing ring jugglers at a circus that visited Steinkjer and added, "It wasn't long before most of the children in town had caught the 'wiggle-rock' craze, now it is all over Norway." In the same summer, schoolgirls in Australia were using the hoops and news came to the United States with the first reference to the toy as a "Hula hoop", described as "all the rage among the female small fry of Australia. This is old fashioned hoops with a difference. You don't roll them; you put them around your middle and by swinging the hips in a circular motion, you keep the hoop revolving— hence the name."

According to The Playmakers: Amazing Origins of Timeless Toys by Tim Walsh, the bamboo hoop's path to plastic started in Australia when a Sydney teacher taught school students how to sway bamboo hoops in sports classes. Australia's Coles department stores then started selling bamboo hoops and demand soon outstripped supply. Coles then asked legendary toy man Alex Tolmer (also known as Alec), who founded toy company Toltoys, to help mass produce hoops. In 1957, Tolmer used Polyethylene which was stronger and less brittle than earlier plastics. The new lightweight plastic hoops sold in a variety of colors for less than $2. Toltoys sold 400,000 plastic hoops in Australia in 1957 alone. According to Tolmer's Melbourne-based son (David Tolmer) Toltoys already had a good working relationship with Wham-O in the United States. When Wham-O told Toltoys the hoop was too generic to warrant a royalty, Alex Tolmer instead asked the U.S. company to sponsor one bed in an Australian children's hospital. By 1958, Wham-O plastic hoops were being used in California and then the craze for hooping swept the United States and beyond.

Joan Anderson (born Joan Constance Manning) coined the name "hula-hoop". She was visiting her birth country of Australia from the United States and saw people twirling bamboo hoops on their waists. She then had her mother ship one to the United States, with her husband Wayne introducing it to Wham-O's Arthur "Spud" Melin as the "hula-hoop" after the Hawaiian dance. Anderson insists that a deal with Wham-O was sealed with a "gentleman's handshake," but Melin would not contact them after it achieved success and did not credit them. Anderson sued Wham-O in 1960 for not paying them for hula hoop sales, with Wham-O arguing that they had not turned a profit despite high sales. Anderson settled for $6,000.

On September 6, 1958, singer Georgia Gibbs appeared on US TV's The Ed Sullivan Show to sing "The Hula Hoop Song". Her last US top-40 hit, it competed with four other songs created in the wake of the huge fad.

Richard Knerr and Melin of Wham-O updated the Toltoys design and manufactured 110 cm (42 in) diameter hoops from Marlex plastic. The earliest known advertisement was seen for the "Hula-Hoop by Wham-O" was seen on June 16, 1958 for "The Broadway" chain of department stores in Los Angeles, for sale for $1.98 (equivalent to $20 more than 60 years later). With giveaways, national marketing and retailing, a fad began in July 1958: twenty-five million plastic hoops were sold in less than four months, and sales reached more than 100 million units in two years. Carlon Products Corporation was one of the first manufacturers of the hula hoop. During the 1950s, Carlon was producing more than 50,000 hula hoops per day. Saddled with a glut of unwanted Hula Hoops, Wham-O stopped manufacturing the toy until 1965, when Knerr and Melin came up with a new twist: They inserted ball bearings in the cylinder to make a "shoosh" sound. The hoop was inducted into the National Toy Hall of Fame at The Strong in Rochester, New York, in 1999.

The hula hoop craze swept the world, dying out in the 1980s except in China and Russia, where hula hooping and hoop manipulation were adopted by traditional circuses and rhythmic gymnasts. In the mid to late 1990s there was a re-emergence of hula hooping, generally referred to as either "hoopdance" or simply "hooping" to distinguish it from the children's playform. The jam band The String Cheese Incident is widely credited with fostering a renewed interest in hooping. Band members started throwing larger adult-sized hoops into their audiences in the mid-1990s, encouraging their fans to hoop and dance, spreading the word and the fun. It wasn't until 2003 with the launch of a former website, Hooping.org, that these small bands of hoopers began to find each other online and a real community and movement began to grow. Bay Area Hoopers began in San Francisco at that time holding regular "hoop jams" with music to hoop to and the hooping group began being replicated in cities around the world. In 2006 Hoopin' Annie had the idea to create a hooping holiday and the first World Hoop Day was held in 2007. Modern hula hooping is seen at numerous festivals and fairs in the USA, UK, Australia, Europe and Latin America.

=== Hooping as an activity ===
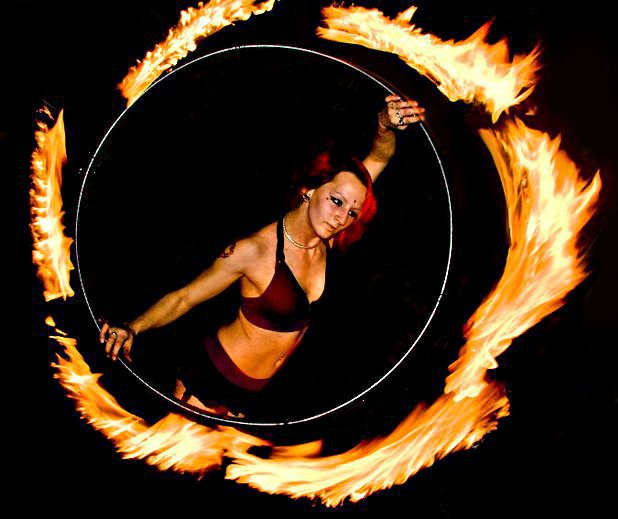
A performer with a fire hula hoop

Many modern hoopers make their own hoops out of PVC piping, or polypropylene tubing (known as polypro). The polyethylene hoops, and especially the polyvinyl chloride hoops, are much larger and heavier than hoops of the 1950s. The size and the weight of the hoop affect the style of the hooper. Heavier, larger hoops are used for beginning dancers and easier tricks, while lighter, thinner tubing is used for quick hand tricks. These hoops may be covered in a fabric or plastic tape to create a visual image and distinguish between the hoop and dancer. Gaffer tape is used to line the inside of a hula hoop to add grip, or a bare hula hoop can be roughened by using sandpaper. Some use glow-in-the dark, patterned, or sparkling tape, and others are produced with clear tubing and are unfilled (child hoops are commonly filled with various materials). LED lighting has been added, allowing hoops to light up at the flick of a switch or a remote control. Programmable "Smart Hoops" are available which provide a range of special effects and some can even be customized through an application on a mobile device.

Modern hooping has created a wide range of tricks. Hooping now includes many "on body" moves and many "off body" moves. A few examples are breaks, isolations, leg hooping, and double hooping.

Hooping is a popular fitness activity, with classes in many cities across the world.

Fire hooping has been introduced, in which spokes are set into the outside of the hoop and tipped with kevlar wicks, which are soaked in fuel and ignited.

Collapsible hula hoops have been developed for easy transport and versatility.

Weighted hula hoops which weigh between 1.5 and 8 pounds are used for exercises and the extra weight usually comes from plastic or padded steel. People use it for weight loss routines and add some easily repetitive routines (and music) to make it fun.
