= Whirlyball =

Team sport played in the United States and Canada

Whirlyball is a team sport that combines elements of basketball and jai alai with players riding "Whirlybugs", small electric vehicles similar to bumper cars. Because play requires a special court, it is played in only a handful of locations in the United States and Canada.

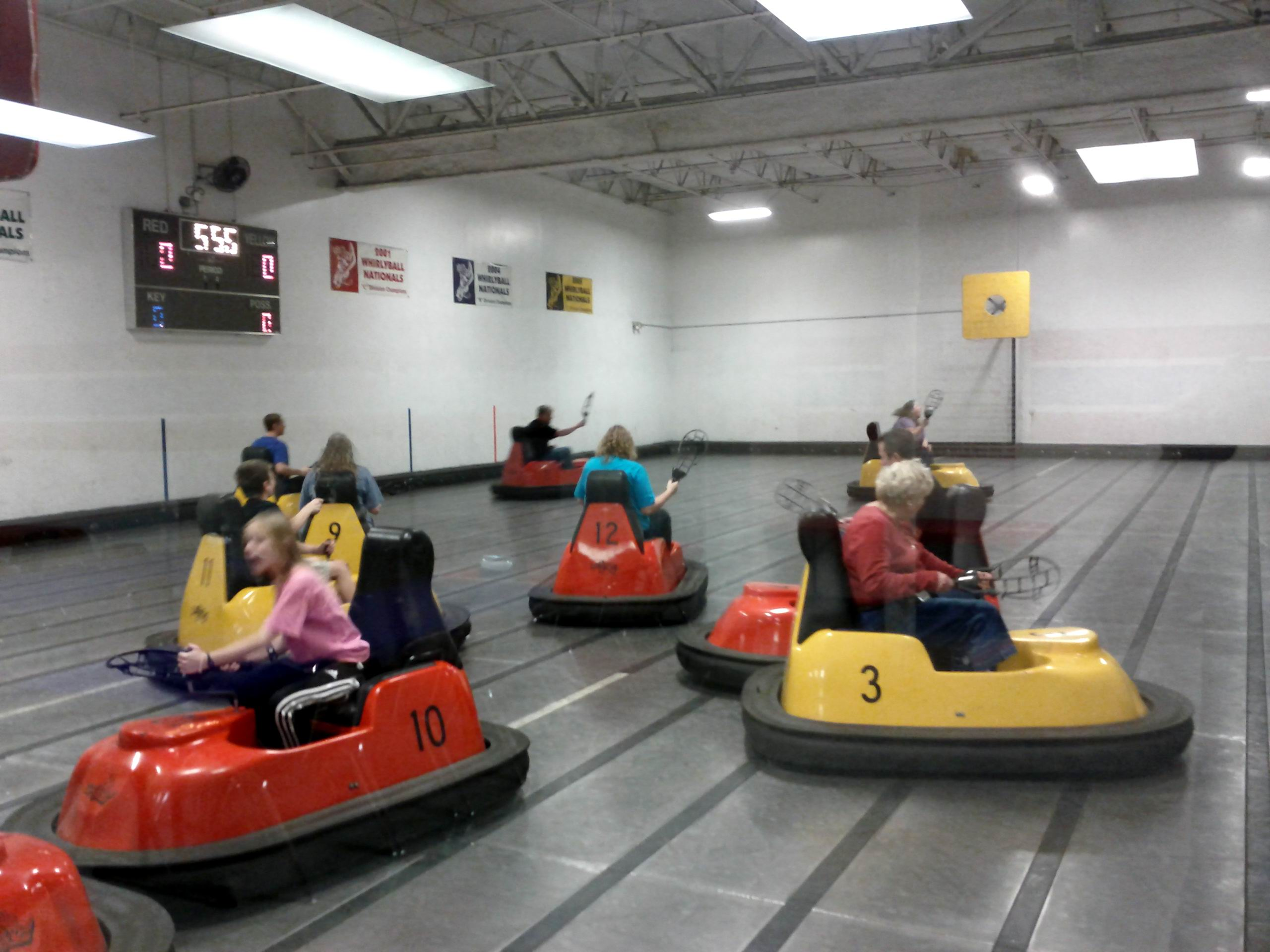
Amateur whirlyball game in progress

== The game ==
A WhirlyBall team consists of five players. Players rides a Whirlybug and carries a scoop, with which to pass the ball, usually a Wiffle ball, or shoot at the goal, a circular target above the two opposite ends of the court. A score in Whirlyball is called a "Whirlic".

Players are not allowed to leave their cars or to touch the ball with their hands. Other than that, almost anything is allowed, within certain bounds of safety, e.g., one is not allowed to ram a player from behind (four-point penalty).

The scoops provided for recreational use are manufactured by Mangum's company, Flo-Tron Enterprises, while many players at the national level prefer to use a Trac Ball scoop due to the lighter weight. In order to use a Trac Ball scoop, players must use an industrial-strength heat gun to mold the scoop to fit the ball.

== Game origins and rules ==
The game was first invented in Utah in the 1960s by Stan Mangum. Whirlyball is a sport that combines lacrosse, bumper cars, and some aspects of basketball. It features two teams of five players riding Whirlybugs, which are specialized bumper cars that offer more agility and steering ability.

The game is played on a court that allows for movement in the Whirlybugs, with the goal of players scoring the ball by making it into a target found on a backboard. The Chicago area of Illinois is a prominent area for Whirlyball enthusiasts and features many possible venues for players to try their hand at this game. Other whirlyball locations include Canada, Colorado, Florida, Kansas, Michigan, Minnesota, Ohio, Texas, Washington and Wisconsin, with Illinois and Minnesota being the states that have multiple locations. The only restriction that the sport of whirlyball has is the height of the players. In order to be eligible to play whirlyball the players must stand at the height of four feet, six inches or taller. Players shorter than this height are prohibited from playing this sport. According to Flo-tron Enterprises, Inc., the sole company that makes whirlyBall products and the Whirlybug, the game is meant to be a competitive team sport that can be played at any level. The highest level played in whirlyball is the international level.

== Whirlybug ==
A Whirlybug is similar to an electric bumper car. It is round, with a bumper going all the way around. Unlike most bumper cars, however, power is not provided by an overhead grid, but rather by alternating conducting plates that make up the floor of the court. Whirlybugs are more complex than traditional bumper cars, but this is necessary, as an overhead grid would obstruct play. A Whirlybug is steered by a handle that looks like a crank. This handle allows steering not just side to side, but also backwards.

One of the downsides to a Whirlybug's controls is the difficulty beginners will almost certainly have with them. One reason is that there is technically no reverse, which can make for an extremely difficult situation for a beginner who has run into a wall. A player must apply the throttle as they are twisting the handle in either direction. After a single rotation, the drive train reverses, and the car moves away from the wall. More experienced players may simply twist the crank a single time and then apply the throttle. The other problem with steering is that Whirlybugs often do not center the crank automatically, making it difficult for beginners to recover from a very tight turn or from "reverse". Once the particulars of the steering are learned—usually in one or two games—the controls tend to be easy to use.

== Terminology ==
- Whirlic: A score in whirlyball is two points.
- Power Shot: Comparable to a lay-up in basketball.
- Slashing: Hitting an opponent scoop while going for the ball. In league play there is a two-point penalty.
- Pillow Block: Driving the Whirlybug into an opponent's bumper and attempting to slow them down by remaining there.
- Roll-Off: While contacting an opponent's bumper, player does a 360-degree roll-off turn and continues momentum.
- Wall Bouncing: Running into the wall and spinning around to advance oneself or lose an opponent.
- Bounce Passing: Bouncing the ball off the floor while passing it to a teammate.
- The Back Door: The area to the side of the key where people frequently lurk to make a quick move to the basket.
- Key: The area directly under the basket and is similar to basketball.
- Dirty Whirly: Bumping an opponent from behind causing them to do a 180-degree turn around and continue backwards.

== Popularity ==
Whirlyball is played as a competitive sport with organized leagues, but it is more commonly played for entertainment. Many whirlyball locations have a sports bar atmosphere, offering billiards and other tabletop games to play between matches.
