= Marlex =

Synthetic material

Marlex is a trademarked name for a crystalline polypropylene and high-density polyethylene (HDPE). These plastics were invented by J. Paul Hogan and Robert Banks, two research chemists at the Phillips Petroleum Company in 1951.

Interest in the material in the 1950s arose from its high melting point and tensile strength, making it more desirable than the more common form of polyethylene. For example, the medical community in 1958 was eager to use Marlex 50 crystalline polyethylene which softens at 260 °F (127 °C). Objects made of Marlex could be sterilized in high-temperature autoclaves without affecting their form.

Marlex was used by Wham-O for their Hula Hoops in the 1950s, which helped create a market for this form of plastic. It is now an integral part to a wide variety of products and markets around the world. Additionally, it can be used surgically as a reinforcing mesh in inguinal hernia repair.
