= Super Elastic Bubble Plastic =

Children's toy

- Product type: Children's toy
- Current owner: Wham-O
- Country: USA
- Introduced: 1970
- Discontinued: Mid 2000s

Super Elastic Bubble Plastic was the brand name for a children's toy manufactured from the 1970s through the 80s by Wham-O. It consisted of a tube of viscous plastic substance and a thin straw used to blow semi-solid bubbles. A pea-sized amount of liquid plastic was squeezed from the tube and made into a ball. One end of the straw was then inserted into the ball, and the user would blow into the other end, inflating the plastic into a bubble. The user could then remove the bubble from the straw by pinching the hole closed, sealing the air inside.

The size of each bubble depended on the amount of plastic used. Roughly the consistency of bubble gum, the bubbles formed were much more durable than simple soap bubbles, and could be gently manipulated to make different shapes, and stacked to make simple figures such as snowmen. However, they were not as durable as preformed balloons and could pop easily if overinflated, handled with too much force, or squeezed.

Chemically, the bubbles contained polyvinyl acetate dissolved in acetone, with ethyl acetate plastic fortifiers added. The acetone evaporated upon bubble inflation, leaving behind a solidified plastic film.

Besides the potential for spills when liquid plastic was handled by children, the substance also emitted noxious fumes. The fumes could become concentrated inside the straw, making it dangerous to inhale through the straw while inflating a bubble. The toy was not recommended for children under 5. Because of these problems, Super Elastic Bubble Plastic was eventually discontinued. This type of toy is banned in Canada, and Super Elastic Bubble Plastic was the subject of a Canadian recall in 2016. Similar products exist under other brand names.
