= Chlorinated polyethylene =

Polyolephin plasticizer

Chlorinated polyethylene (PE-C or CPE) is an inexpensive variation of polyethylene, where chlorine is substituted for some of the hydrogen atoms. CPE has a chlorine content from 34 to 44%.

Due to its soft, rubbery texture, CPE is added to polyvinyl chloride to increase its impact and weather resistance. Furthermore, it is used for softening PVC foils, without risking plasticizer migration.

Chlorinated polyethylene can be crosslinked with peroxides to form an elastomer which is used in cable and rubber industries. When chlorinated polyethylene is added to other polyolefins, it reduces the flammability. Chlorinated polyethylene is sometimes used in power cords as an outer jacket.

Chlorinated polyethylene is listed on the Living Building Institute's Red List of materials that cannot be used.

== See also ==
- Hypalon
- Cross-linked polyethylene
