= Roller racer =

Toy vehicle for children

A Roller Racer, or Flying Turtle as it was originally named by the inventor, is a toy human-powered vehicle for children. It was invented in the 1970s by a retired Boeing engineer as a gift for his grandson, using a tractor seat for the prototype toy. The vehicle consists of an injection-molded, polyethylene seat with rear wheels, attached to a T-style handlebar by a pin joint. The handlebars also have wheels, attached to what would be the vertical part of the "T". In the 1980s the Roller Racer was sold under the WHAM-O brand name Dragonfire, but has been manufactured by Mason Corporation of Brentwood, Tennessee, US, since January 1987 .

The method of propulsion is unique to this scooter. The user moves forward by oscillating the handlebars from side to side. Published studies in Experimental Non-Linear Physics have been conducted worldwide on this product. It is used in amusement parks, schools, day care centers, family fun centers and homes.
