= Slip 'N Slide =

Plastic waterslide toy used on lawns

- Type: Slide
- Invented by: Robert Carrier
- Company: Wham-O
- Country: United States
- Availability: 1961–current
- Official website

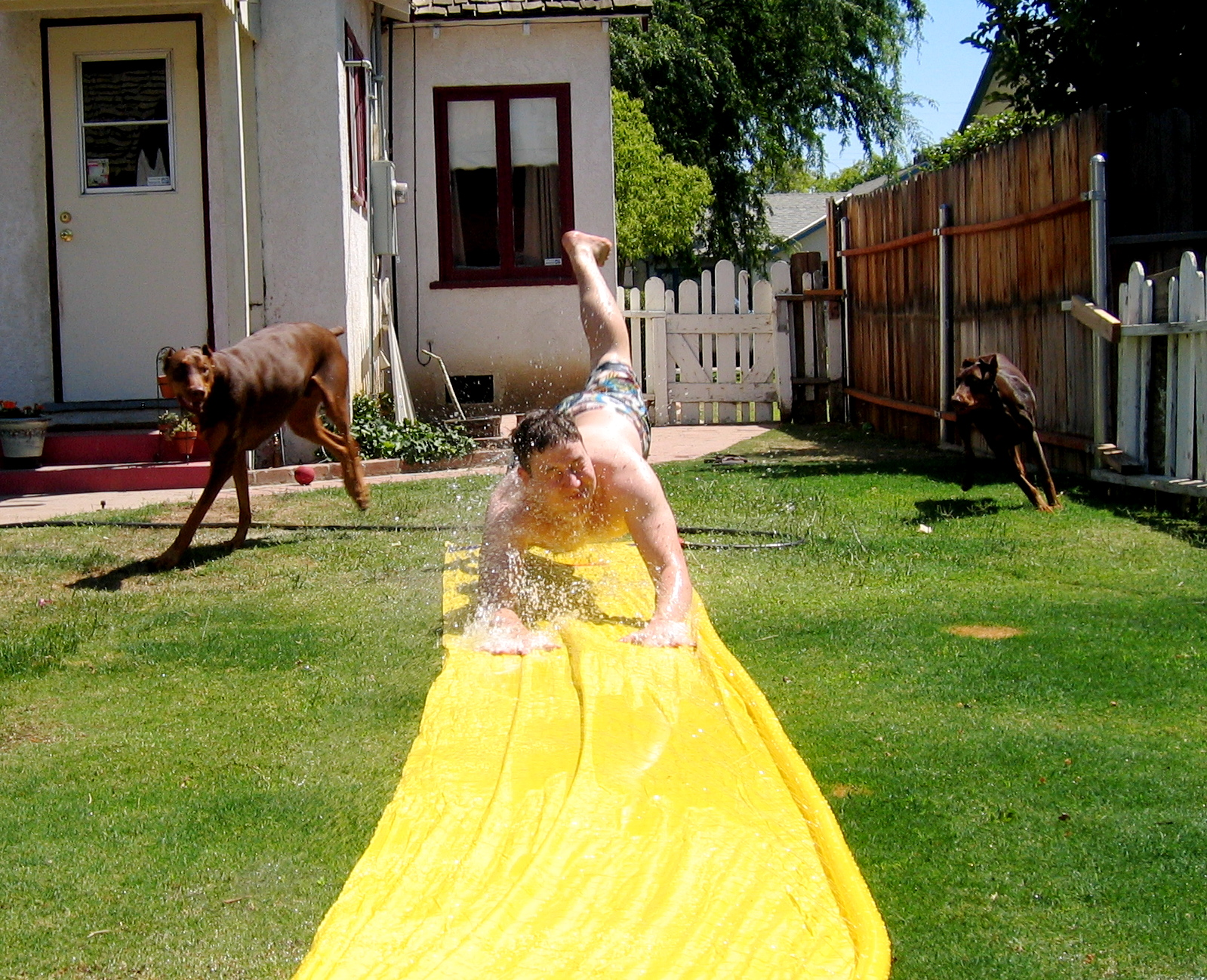
A Slip 'N Slide

Slip 'N Slide is a children's toy invented by Robert Carrier and manufactured by Wham-O. It was first sold in 1961. The main form is a plastic sheet and a method of wetting it; when the surface is wet it becomes very slippery, thus allowing the user to slide along it. Some versions also include spray tubes on both sides and an inflatable swimming pool for the user to slide into at the end of the slide.

== History ==
The creator was inspired by his son sliding on wet, painted concrete. He used his job as an upholsterer to obtain a long strip of Naugahyde, sewed a tube to pass a hose into, and punctured the tube sporadically to allow water to spurt out. Carrier sold his invention to Wham-O where they replaced Naugahyde with plastic to reduce production costs.

The toy is a long sheet of thin plastic, constructed with a heat-sealed tube running along one side. The tube can be connected to any garden hose and water goes in the tube and out through small holes, spraying onto the sliding surface where it becomes very slippery, allowing users to slide the length of the sheet, which also has lubricant molded into the plastic that acts as a propellant. The lifetime sales of the slide reached 30 million by 2011.

Beyond 2001, Wham-O and makers of similar competitive products later included various enhancements such as an inflatable pool at one end of the sliding surface, spray tubes on both sides, and longer paths.

== Safety ==
The Consumer Product Safety Commission (CPSC) and the manufacturer recommend that the use of the toy is only for children to avoid back and neck injuries if used by adults and teenagers. The recommended age range is five to twelve, as people older than this might stop suddenly when diving onto the toy due to their weight or height. Between 1973 and 1991, a 13-year-old and seven adults suffered neck injuries or paralysis while using Slip 'N Slides.

In 1993, the CPSC provided a recall notice, along with Kransco, which owned Wham-O at the time, to warn users of the dangers. The product was not taken off the market completely, but it was recommended only for children.
