= Robert Banks (chemist) =

American chemist (1921–1989)

- Born: November 24, 1921; Piedmont, Missouri
- Died: January 3, 1989 (aged 67); Oklahoma
- Education: University of Missouri - Rolla
- Known for: high-density polyethylene
- Scientific career
- Fields: chemistry
- Workplaces: Phillips Petroleum

Robert L. Banks (November 24, 1921 – January 3, 1989) was an American chemist. He was born and grew up in Piedmont, Missouri. He attended the University of Missouri, Rolla, and initiated into Alpha Phi Omega in 1940. He joined the Phillips Petroleum company in 1946 and worked there until he retired in 1985. He died in Oklahoma on January 3, 1989.

== Technical contributions ==
He was a fellow research chemist of J. Paul Hogan. They began working together in 1946, and in 1951 invented "crystalline polypropylene" and high-density polyethylene (HDPE). These plastics were initially known by the name Marlex. The polymerization of ethylene was made possible by their discovery of the so-called Phillips catalyst.

== Recognition ==
In 1987, Banks and Hogan won the Perkin Medal, and in 2001 they were inducted into the National Inventors Hall of Fame. Both were given a Heroes of Chemistry award by the American Chemical Society in 1989. Banks was inducted into the Plastics Hall of Fame in 2014.
