= Trac Ball =

Ball game

Trac Ball (or Trac-Ball, or Tracball) is a type of racket game. It is typically a game of catch played by two or more people wherein both participants wield an oversized glove/racquet/basket, passing a ball back and forth. The racquet is similar in appearance and function to a jai alai basket. Trac Ball is also utilized in a game called whirlyball, which is a game played on bumper cars where two teams using track balls attempt to score goals against one another by throwing the Trac Ball into the opposing team's elevated net.

== Curving ==
A unique aspect of Trac Ball is the ease at which curves can be attained. The grooves in the racquet along with the striations on the ball provide a great deal of spin which allows players to throw deep curveballs with little effort.

Holding the racquet perpendicular to the ground and throwing forward will cause the ball to spin backwards towards the thrower. This usually causes a higher flight than intended when aiming directly at the catcher. Throw distance is extended by ball spin, but the curve is otherwise unnoticeable.

A more dramatic curving effect can be caused by holding the racquet parallel to the ground. The ball will curve back towards the catcher if, for instance, the racquet is held out to the right by a right-handed person and the ball is aimed approximately 30 degrees to the left of the catcher or more (depending on the velocity of the throw).

Early versions of the Wham-o sets included two extra Styrofoam balls. The Styrofoam balls produced more dramatic curves and less intimidating velocities. It is unclear why they are missing from later sets.

== Adoption by other sports ==
The "scoop" commonly used in whirlyball is a Trac Ball racquet, although a wiffle ball is substituted for the traditional Trac Ball.
