= J. Paul Hogan =

American chemist (1919–2012)

John Paul Hogan (August 7, 1919 – February 19, 2012) was an American research chemist. Along with Robert Banks, he discovered methods of producing polypropylene and high-density polyethylene.

== Early life ==
Hogan was born in Lowes, Kentucky to Charles Franklin and Alma (Wyman) Hogan and earned B.S. degrees in both Chemistry and Physics at Murray State University of Kentucky in 1942. He taught at both the high school and college level before going to work in research at the Phillips Petroleum Company in 1944.

== Professional career ==
His work was primarily in the area of plastics and catalysts. In 1951, he invented crystalline polypropylene and high-density polyethylene (HDPE) with his fellow research chemist Robert Banks. The initial research drive was to oligomerize light olefins which were byproducts at the time from catalytic cracking reactions developed during WWII. Hogan and Banks had hoped to create a liquid fuel with high octane (antiknock) performance. However, in a series of experiments, and after having added chromium as a second transition metal promoter, the scientists created crystalline structures. These plastics were initially known by the name Marlex. He held (jointly) a number of important patents and authored research papers before he left Phillips in 1985.

After a few years as an independent consultant, he fully retired in 1993.

In 1987, he and Robert Banks together received the Perkin Medal Award and both were given a Heroes of Chemistry award by the American Chemical Society in 1989. In 2001, they were inducted into the National Inventors Hall of Fame. Dr. Hogan was inducted into the Plastics Hall of Fame in 2014.
