= Jai alai =

Type of sport

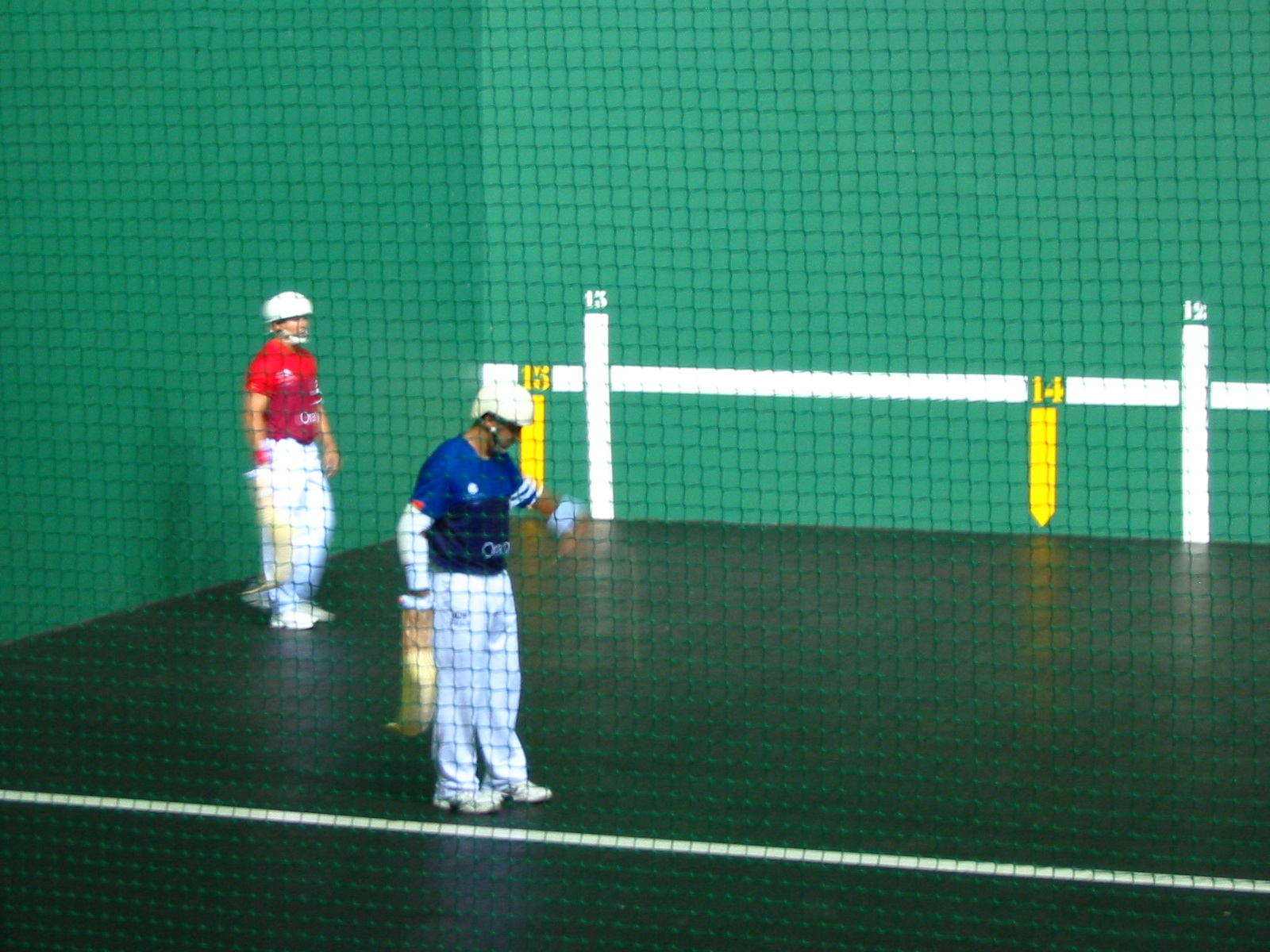
- Jai alai play in progress
- First played: 14th century

Characteristics
- Contact: No
- Team members: Various
- Type: Indoor–outdoor
- Equipment: pelota, xistera/cesta

Jai alai (/ˈhaɪ.əlaɪ/ HYE-ə-lye: [ˈxai aˈlai]; literally in Basque: "joyful party") is a Basque sport involving bouncing a ball against walls by accelerating it to high speeds with a xistera, a wicker basket-like glove. It is a variation of Basque pelota. The term jai alai, coined by Serafin Baroja in 1875, is also often loosely applied to the fronton (the walled playing-area). The game, whose name means "merry festival" in Basque, is called zesta-punta ("basket tip") in the Basque Country. The sport is played worldwide, especially in Spain, France, the American state of Florida, and the Mexican state of Baja California.

== Rules and customs ==
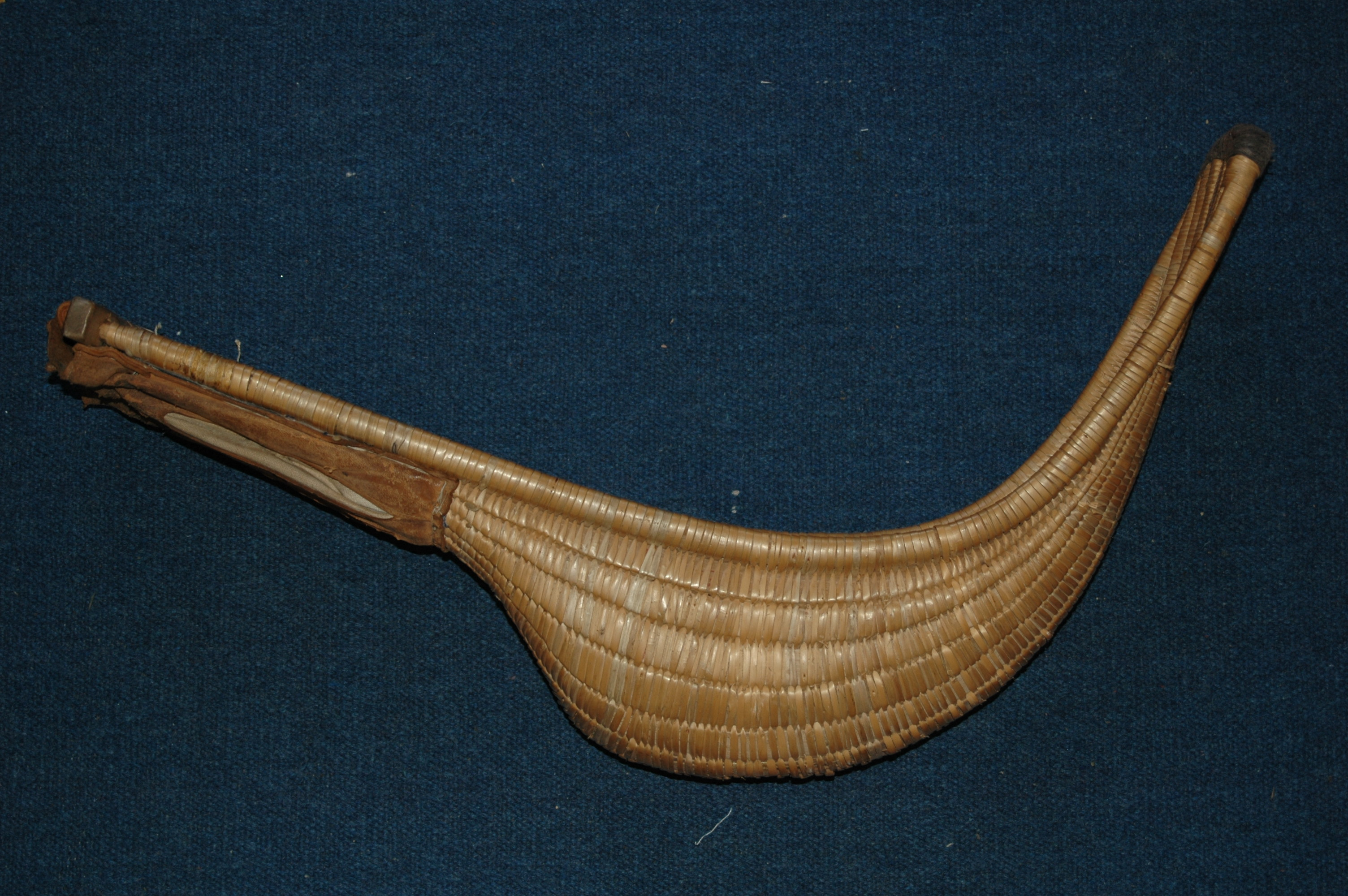
Long xistera

The court for jai alai consists of walls on the front, back, and left, and the floor between them. If the ball (called a pelota in Spanish, pilota in Standard Basque) touches the floor outside these walls, it is considered out of bounds. Similarly, there is also a border on the lower 3 feet (0.9 m) of the front wall that is also out of bounds. The ceiling on the court is usually very high, so the ball has a more predictable path. The court is divided by 14 parallel lines going horizontally across the floor, line 1 nearest the front wall and line 14 nearest the back wall. In doubles, each team consists of a frontcourt player and a backcourt player. The game begins when the frontcourt player of the first team serves the ball to the second team. The winner of each point stays on the court to meet the next team in rotation. Losers go to the end of the line to await another turn on the court. The first team to score 7 points (or 9 in Superfecta games) wins. The next highest scores are awarded "place" (second) and "show" (third) positions, respectively. Playoffs decide tied scores.

The most common American version of jai alai is played in round robin format, usually between eight teams of two players each or eight single players, although in rare instances the teams may consist of three players each or triples. The first team to score 7 or 9 points wins the game. Two of the eight teams are in the court for each point. The server on one team must bounce the ball behind the serving line, then with the cesta "basket" hurl it towards the front wall so it strikes the front wall first and if it is not caught by the other team before it bounces, must bounce between lines 4 and 7 on the floor. The ball is then in play. The ball used in jai alai is hand crafted and consists of virgin rubber strands tightly wound together and then wrapped in two layers of goat skin. Once the ball is in play, the other team must catch and return it before it bounces twice. The process of catching and throwing must be completed in one fluid motion with no "juggling" or "holding" of the ball. The ball may be caught either on the fly or after bouncing once on the floor but cannot bounce twice. A team scores a point if an opposing player:

- fails to serve the ball directly to the front wall so that upon rebound it will bounce between lines No. 4 and 7. If it does not, it is an under or over serve and the other team will receive the point.
- fails to catch the ball on the fly or after one bounce
- holds or juggles the ball
- hurls the ball out of bounds
- interferes with a player attempting to catch and hurl the ball. These interference plays are called at the judges' discretion and most times, the point is replayed.

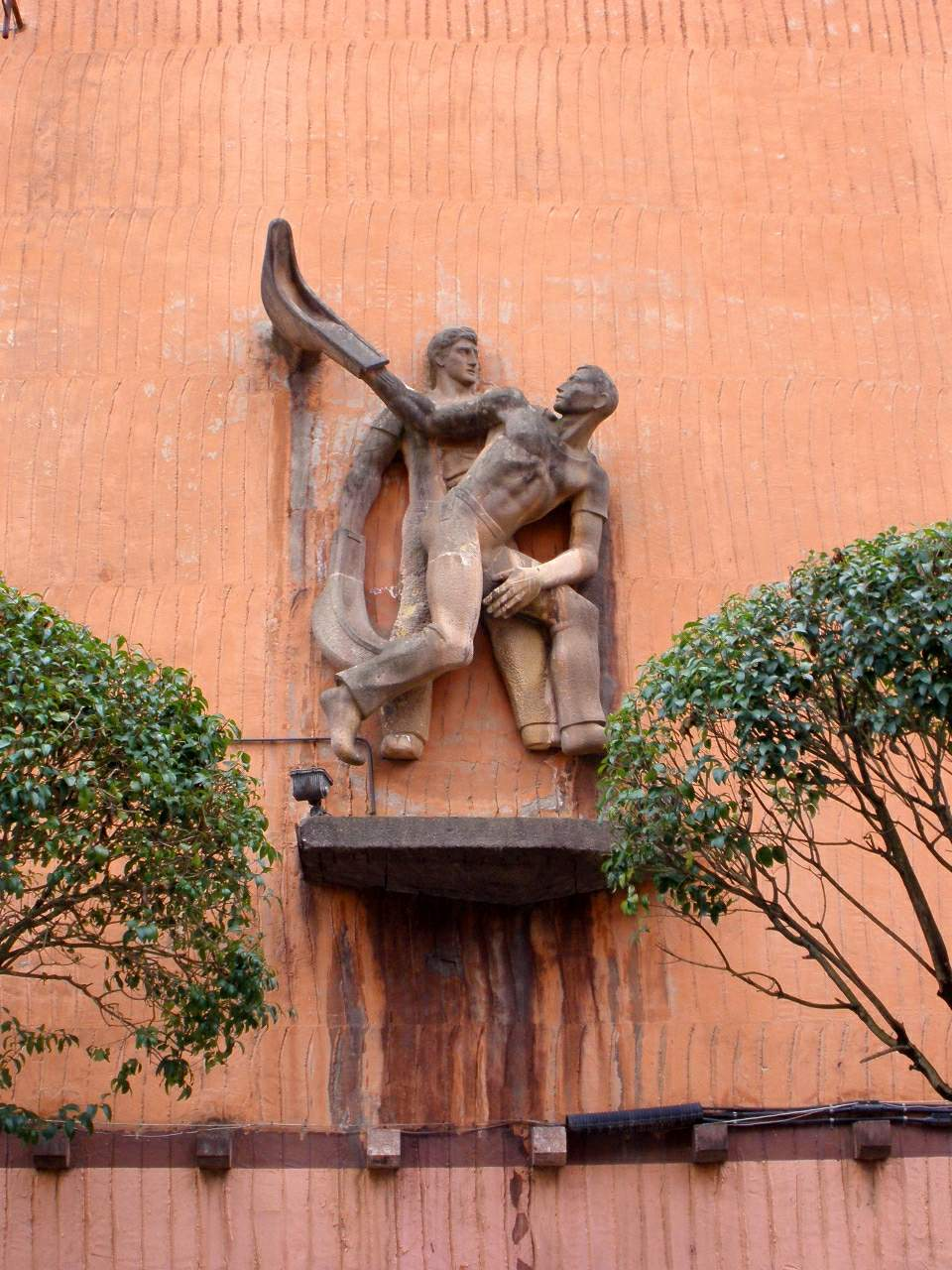
Guernica Fronton, Basque Country, Spain

The team scoring a point remains in the court and the opposing team rotates off the court to the end of the list of opponents. Points usually double after the first round of play, once each team has played at least one point. When a game is played with points doubling after the first round, this is called "Spectacular Seven" or "Spectacular Nine" scoring if the games are played to nine points.

The players frequently attempt a "chula" shot, where the ball is played off the front wall then reaches the bottom of the back wall by the end of its arc. The "chula" is when the ball rebounds low off the back wall with very little to no bounce, almost rolling along the floor.

Since there is no wall on the right side, all jai alai players must play right-handed (wear the cesta on their right hand), as the spin of a left-handed throw would give a tremendous advantage to the left handed player due to the incredible amount of spin.

The Basque government promotes jai alai as "the fastest sport in the world" because of the speed of the ball. The sport once held the world record for ball speed with a 125–140 g ball covered with goatskin that traveled at 302 km/h (188 mph), performed by José Ramón Areitio at the Newport, Rhode Island Jai Alai, until it was broken by Canadian five-time long drive champion Jason Zuback on a 2007 episode of Sport Science with a golf ball speed of 328 km/h (204 mph).

The sport can be dangerous, due to the ball's high velocities. It has led to injuries that caused players to retire and fatalities have been recorded in some cases.

== Industry ==
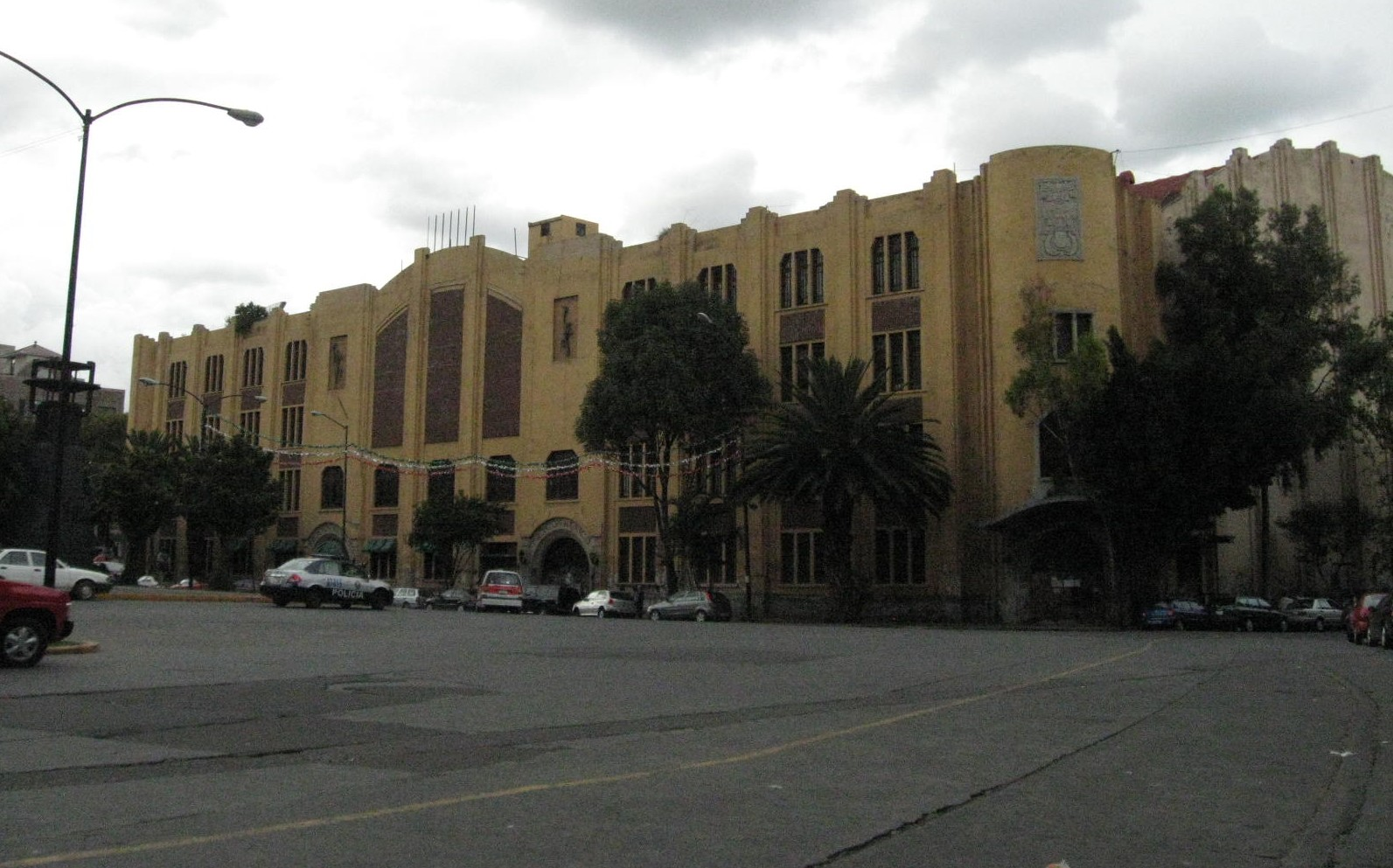
Jai alai arena in Mexico City near the Monument to the Revolution

Jai alai is popular in Latin America and the Philippines because of its Hispanic origin. It was one of the two gambling sports from Europe, the other being horse racing, in the semi-colonial Chinese cities of Shanghai and Tianjin, and was shut down after the communist victory there. The jai alai arena in Tianjin's former Italian Concession was then confiscated and turned into a recreation center for the city's working class.

=== The Philippines ===
Jai alai was played in Manila at the Manila Jai Alai Building, one of the most significant Art Deco buildings in Asia, which was demolished in 2000 by the Manila city government. In 1986, jai alai was prohibited nationwide due to problems with game fixing. However, the game returned to the country once again in March 2010 in the province of Pangasinan. It was briefly paused in 2011 by a blanket restriction on non-traditional sports abetted by a Chinese lottery jueteng, but the ban was lifted immediately. Nowadays, jai alai is played strictly as a competitive and entertainment sport at the Casino Español de Manila.

=== United States ===
In the United States, jai alai enjoyed some popularity as a gambling alternative to horse racing, greyhound racing, and harness racing, and was particularly popular in Florida and Connecticut, where the game was used as a basis for parimutuel betting.

The first jai alai fronton in the United States was in St. Louis, Missouri, operating around the time of the 1904 World's Fair.

From 1988 to 1991, the International Jai-Alai Players Association held the longest strike in American professional sport. After the 1988 season, the players, 90% of them Basque, returned home and threatened not to come back unless the owners improved their work conditions. Spain was no longer a poor conservative country and the new generation of players were influenced by leftist Basque nationalism. The owners, however, offered the same terms and substituted with inexperienced locals, while the world-class stars picketed the courts for years. The strike ended with an agreement, and later strikes were placated with salary rises. Meanwhile, Native American casinos and state lotteries had appeared as an alternative to jai alai betting.

==== Florida ====
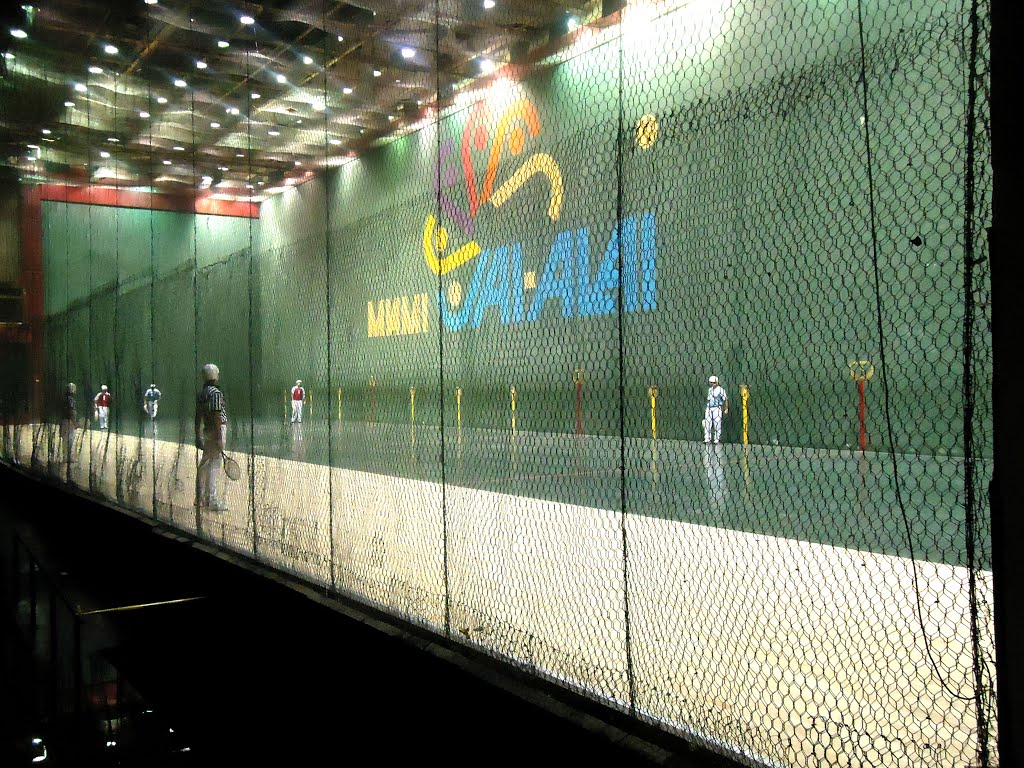
Miami Jai Alai fronton, built in 1926 and known as "The Yankee Stadium of Jai Alai"

The first fronton in Florida opened at the site of Hialeah Race Course near Miami in 1924. The fronton was relocated to its present site in Miami near Miami International Airport. The Miami Jai-Alai Fronton (now Casino Miami) was the biggest in the world with a record audience of 15,502 people on 27 December 1975.

Besides the fronton in Miami, there were at one time at least 10 other jai alai frontons in the state.

The Tampa Jai Alai fronton opened in 1952 and operated until 1998. It was located on South Dale Mabry Highway on land that now hosts a Home Depot. The seating capacity of the fronton was around 4,000.

The Dania Jai Alai fronton opened on December 23, 1953, and continues to operate at the present day Casino @ Dania Beach. After a brief hiatus from live performances that began in 2021, Dania continued jai alai for the 2024–2025 season and further experienced a resurgence in attendance and popularity the following year for its 2025–2026 season that ran from December 4, 2025, to February 28, 2026. Dania currently features young talent such as players Johan, Argoitia, and Laborde that are part of the new generation of players continuing the Basque tradition.

Jai alai was also played in Florida at Palm Beach Jai-Alai in West Palm Beach; Orlando Jai-Alai in Casselberry: Daytona Jai-Alai at the Daytona international Speedway; and Big Bend Jai-Alai in Quincy. It was played seasonally at Fort Pierce Jai-Alai in Fort Pierce, Ocala Jai-Alai in Reddick, and Jasper Jai-Alai in Hamilton.

One Florida fronton, in Melbourne, was converted from jai alai to greyhound racing, although it later closed.

In an effort to prevent the closure of frontons in Florida, the Florida State Legislature passed HB 1059, a bill that changed the rules regarding the operation and wagering of poker in a parimutuel facility such as a jai alai fronton and a greyhound and horseracing track. The bill became law on August 6, 2003.

The World Jai Alai League (WJAL) operated a fronton at the Magic City Casino northwest of downtown Miami. The fronton offered two kinds of games: the traditional parimutuel game, in which eight contestants compete for win, place and show finishes; and "battle court", in which players participate in singles and doubles matches, akin to tennis, and accumulate points as in a dual meet. Matches are played with rubber balls and streamed online from the Jai Alai World website. Jai Alai World also hosts special jai alai events include the U.S. Jai Alai Championship and World Super Court. This fronton closed following the 2025 season, after the casino was purchased by a new owner who ended its lease with the World Jai Alai League.

==== Present status ====
In the mid-to-late 20th century, games could draw 5,000 spectators, a figure that fell to as few as 50 by 2017. In 2022, BetRivers became a sponsor and began taking wagers from users outside Florida. Exclusivity rights held by the Seminole Tribe of Florida have complicated the ability of Floridians to directly gamble on jai alai; in 2024, the WJAL reached a settlement with the Seminoles allowing users of the tribe's "Hard Rock Bet" mobile sports betting app to wager on its jai alai matches.

Today, only two frontons remain open in the state.

On February 13, 2026, the Casino Miami fronton reopened for jai alai as JAM Arena with a match of the World Jai Alai League, which moved there after its lease on the Magic City Casino expired.

The second operational fronton is located at The Casino @ Dania Beach, which operates primarily in the winter months.

==== New England ====
Professional jai alai frontons no longer exist in Connecticut and Rhode Island, where they first opened in the 1970s, waning as other gambling options became available.

In Connecticut, there were frontons in Hartford, Milford, and Bridgeport, all of which have permanently closed. The Milford fronton opened in May 1977 and closed in 2001. The fronton at Hartford opened in the summer of 1976 and closed in 1995 The Bridgeport fronton opened in 1976 and ended jai alai in 1995. It was converted to a greyhound race track, which struggled financially, and closed in 2005. Jai alai returned to Connecticut with the 2010 construction of the Connecticut Amateur Jai Alai fronton in Berlin. The fronton was a personal passion project of Matt DiDomizio and does not offer gambling or organized leagues.

The fronton at Newport Jai Alai in Newport, Rhode Island was built on the site of the city dump, opening in May 1976. Jai alai playing ended in 2003, at which point the facility was converted into Newport Grand, a slot machine and video lottery terminal parlor, which closed permanently in August 2018.

==== Las Vegas ====
Jai alai enjoyed a brief and popular stint in Las Vegas with the opening of a fronton at the MGM Grand Hotel and Casino; however, by the early 1980s, the fronton was losing money and was closed by MGM Grand owner Kirk Kerkorian. The MGM Grand in Reno also showcased jai alai for a very short period (1978–1980). On July 17, 2012, the Nevada Gaming Commission voted to remove jai alai from the state's gaming regulations.

==== Amateur jai alai ====
During the late 1960s, in addition to North Miami Amateur, there was at least one other amateur court. From International Amateur Jai-Alai in South Miami, professional players emerged including "Randy" at World Jai-Alai, regarded as the first American pelotari who turned pro in 1968 and enjoyed a lengthy career. In the 1970s and early 1980s, Orbea's Jai-Alai in Hialeah featured four indoor courts. Two of the courts played with hard rubber balls (Spanish: pelota de goma) were shorter than a standard court (75 and 90 feet (23 and 27 m), respectively) and used for training players and amateur leagues. In addition, two courts were played with the regulation pelota (hardball / pelota dura), one short in length (115 feet (35 m)) and one regulation length (150 feet (46 m)). Orbea's also sold equipment such as cestas and helmets.

The first public amateur jai alai facility was in Milford, Connecticut, and owned by Charlie Hernandez. Future frontons were built in the United States, including one in 2008 in St. Petersburg, Florida, with the assistance of the city of St. Petersburg and private funding from Jeff Conway (Laca).

In addition to the amateur court in St. Petersburg, The American Jai-Alai Foundation offers lessons. Its president, Victor Valcarce, was a pelotari at Dania Jai-Alai (MAGO) and was considered the best "rubber ball" player in the world. Sponsored in North Miami Beach, Florida which was once owned by World Jai-Alai as a school that, in 1972, produced the greatest American pelotari, Joey Cornblit.

Retired players visited and played as well as highly skilled amateurs, professionals from Miami Jai-Alai and various other professional frontons operating at the time. The additions of the South Miami, North Miami, Orbea, and, later, the Milford amateur courts are generally considered to be the golden age of the amateur jai-alai player and the sport in the United States. In the late 1980s, at least one other amateur court was constructed in Connecticut.

== In popular culture ==
In media, jai alai was a storyline in Mad Men season 3, episode 3 (aired September 6, 2009) centering on a wealthy client's son intending to use his money to hire the show's fictional firm, Sterling Cooper, to help advertise jai alai in attempt to make it the next national pastime for the US and replace baseball.

Jai alai is also featured in Dungeon Crawler Carl, where the titular character Carl is granted a "Cesta Punta skill" and is equipped with a xistera.

== See also ==
- Basque Pelota World Championships
- Raquetball
- Trac Ball
