= Cryogenic distillation =

Cryogenic distillation may refer to:

- The cryogenic air liquification process used to separate gases from air.
- Cryogenic liquification processes more generally, such as the liquification of Natural Gas, or the liquification of processed oxygen and methane gas on Mars to make rocket propellants and storable chemical feedstuffs for other processes.
- A form of vacuum distillation in which the product is collected with the aid of very low temperatures.
