= Richard Knerr =

American inventor (1925–2008)

- Born: Richard Knerr; 30 June 1925
- Died: 14 January 2008 (aged 82)
- Occupation: Inventor
- Known for: Co-founder of Wham-O with Arthur Melin

Richard Knerr (30 June 1925 – 14 January 2008) was an American inventor best known for marketing the Frisbee and Hula hoop.

== Career ==
=== Wham-O ===
In 1948, he co-founded the company Wham-O with Arthur Melin (nicknamed "Spud"). In 1957, an Australian visiting California told them offhand that in his home country, children twirled bamboo hoops around their waists in gym class. Knerr and Melin saw how popular such a toy would be, and soon they were winning rave reviews from school children for the hollow plastic prototype they had created.
