= Whitening =

Whitening, Whitener or Whiten may refer to:

== Processes or techniques ==
- Cloud whitening, a proposed solar radiation management climate engineering technique
- Key whitening, increasing the security of a cryptographic cipher
- Racial whitening, an ideology in Brazil 1889–1914
  - Blanqueamiento, the practice of marrying whiter people in order to have whiter offspring
- Signal whitening, decorrelation in signal processing
- Skin whitening, using chemical substances to lighten the skin
- Software whitening, an approach to coping with bias in random number generation
- Tooth whitening, in dentistry
- Whitening (leather processing), a leather production process
- Whitening transformation, in mathematics

== People ==
- Andrew Whiten (born 1948), a British zoologist and psychologist
- Colette Whiten (born 1945), Canadian sculptor and artist
- Mark Whiten (born 1966), American baseball player
- Tim Whiten (born 1941), an American-born Canadian artist
- Basil Lee Whitener (1915–1989), an American politician
- Catherine Evans Whitener (1880–1964), a textile artisan in Georgia, US
- Gordon Whitener, founder, chairman, and CEO of The Whitener Company, a Tennessee-based consulting and investment firm
- Helen Whitener (born 1964/1965), a Trinidadian-American attorney and jurist
- Paul Whitener (1911–1959), an American landscape painter and museum director
- Todd Whitener (born 1978), an American musician

== Other uses ==
- Corrective fluid, a white fluid applied to paper to mask errors in text
- Non-dairy creamer, commonly called tea whitener or coffee whitener
- Optical brightener, an additive used to enhance the appearance of colour of fabric and paper
- Stress-whitening, where a white line appears when a material is stressed by bending or punching

== See also ==
- Albicans (disambiguation)
- Whitten (disambiguation)
- Whiten v Pilot Insurance Co, 2002 Supreme Court of Canada case
