= Removable glue =

Low-tack adhesive that produces a removable, non-permanent joint

Removable glue (sometimes incorrectly called fugitive glue) also called credit card glue, E-z-release glue, or (colloquially) booger glue, snot glue, or gooey glue, is a low-tack adhesive that produces a removable, non-permanent joint.

Removable glues are usually available in hot melt or latex form, with low VOC emissions. They can be also applied in liquid form.
