= Glue dots =

Glue dots are pressure-sensitive adhesive dots, used in various different applications, such as sticking credit cards to paper, arts and crafts, and as a safe adhesive for children to use, without needing a hot glue gun. Glue dots are globules of adhesive, which allow attachments to float above a page. They provide a clean and instant bond and are often a more suitable solution than hot or liquid glues or adhesive tapes. Glue dots leave much less mess, residue, and odor which help present a product in the best way, whilst increasing productivity and reducing costs. Removable glue dots also allow you to create a bond which can be removed when needed.

== Types of glue dots ==
Glue dots are supplied in different tack levels:

- High Tack Glue Dots: for removable or temporary fixing such as sticking credit cards to letterheads.
- Low Tack Glue Dots: still removable, but create much stronger adhesion for heavier items, such as sticking CDs to magazines.
- High Shear Tack: semi-permanent glue dots with vertical hold ability that will create a strong bond between most surfaces.
- Super High Tack: permanent glue dots which will create a strong, permanent bond between most surfaces.

The strength of the bond is dependent on the materials being bonded. It is recommended to carry out adequate testing to determine the correct tack level needed.

== Benefits ==
Glue dots create bonds instantly, leave no mess, cause less waste, and avoid harmful burns which some people may experience when using a hot glue gun.

== Uses of glue dots ==
- Point of purchase display assembly.
- Adhering matting in picture frames.
- Sealing and resealing food & beverage cartons.
- Building (gluing) pocket/presentation folders.
- Make a non-adhesive product, adhesive.
- Assembling sample books.
- Securing items prior to shrink wrapping.
- Sign and display manufacturing.
- Securing items within clamshells.
- Joining sheeting, films, liners, papers, etc.
- Mounting lightweight trims, boards.
- Scrapbooking.
- Card making.
- School crafts.

== Glue dot dispensers ==
While glue dots can be applied manually in most cases, for commercial uses ease of application and productivity can be increased by using a glue dot dispenser. Using a dispenser also ensures that adhesive patterns are properly aligned upon application.
