= Fire ecology =

Study of fire in ecosystems

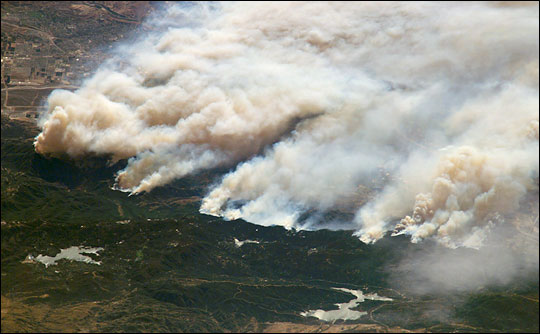
The Old Fire burning in the San Bernardino Mountains (image taken from the International Space Station)

Fire ecology is a scientific discipline concerned with the effects of fire on natural ecosystems. Many ecosystems, particularly prairie, savanna, chaparral and coniferous forests, have evolved with fire as an essential contributor to habitat vitality and renewal. Many plant species in fire-affected environments use fire to germinate, establish, or to reproduce. Wildfire suppression not only endangers these species, but also the animals that depend upon them.

Wildfire suppression campaigns in the United States have historically molded public opinion to believe that wildfires are harmful to nature. Ecological research has shown, however, that fire is an integral component in the function and biodiversity of many natural habitats, and that the organisms within these communities have adapted to withstand, and even to exploit, natural wildfire. More generally, fire is now regarded as a 'natural disturbance', similar to flooding, windstorms, and landslides, that has driven the evolution of species and controls the characteristics of ecosystems.

Fire suppression, in combination with other human-caused environmental changes, may have resulted in unforeseen consequences for natural ecosystems. Some large wildfires in the United States have been blamed on years of fire suppression and the continuing expansion of people into fire-adapted ecosystems as well as climate change. Land managers are faced with tough questions regarding how to restore a natural fire regime, but allowing wildfires to burn is likely the least expensive and most effective method in many situations.

== Fire components ==
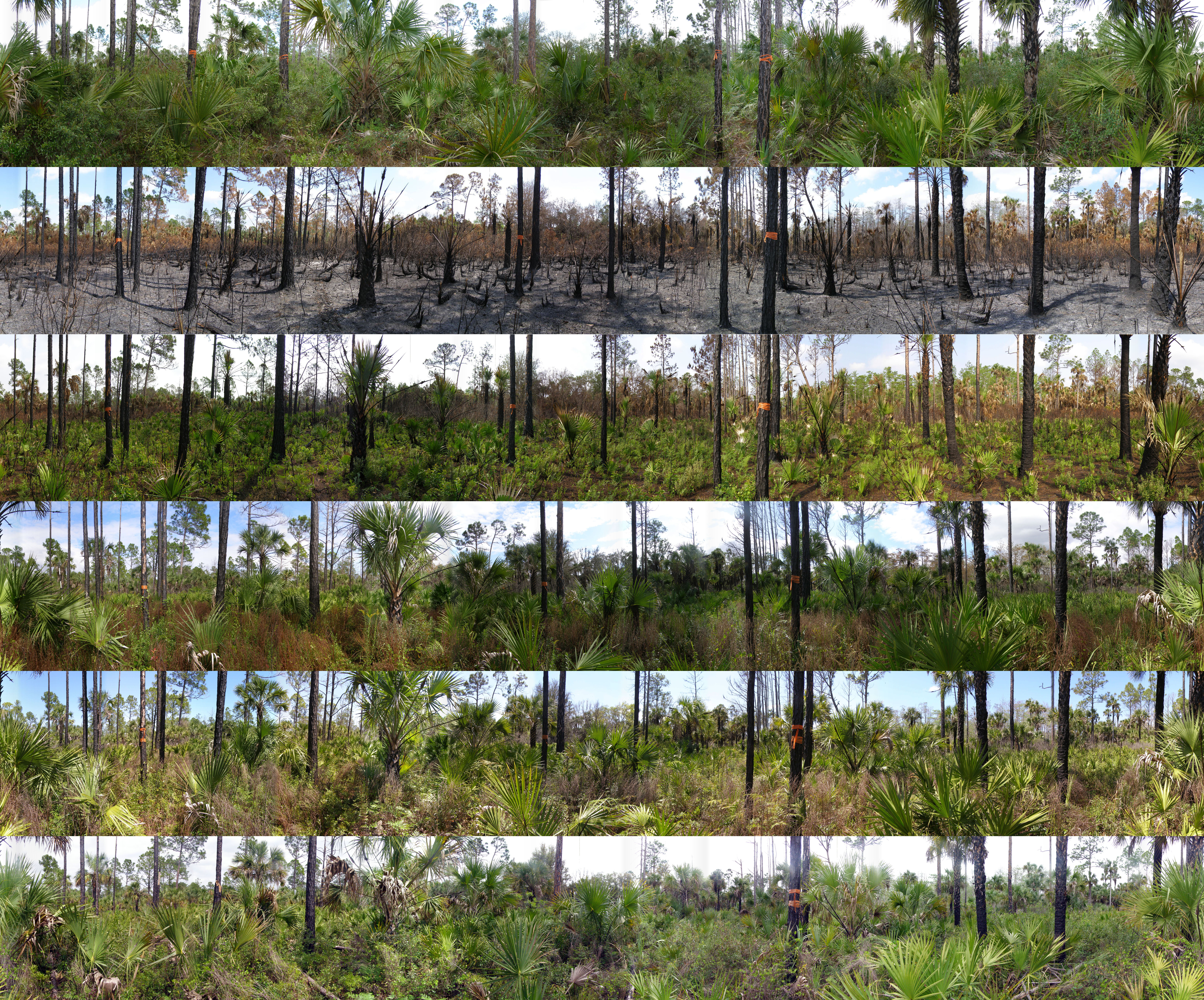
A combination of photos taken at a photo point at Florida Panther NWR. The photos are panoramic and cover a 360 degree view from a monitoring point. These photos range from pre-burn to two years post burn.

A fire regime describes the characteristics of fire and how it interacts with a particular ecosystem. Its "severity" is a term that ecologists use to refer to the impact that a fire has on an ecosystem. It is usually studied using tools such as remote sensing which can detect burned area estimates, severity and fire risk associated with an area. Ecologists can define this in many ways, but one way is through an estimate of plant mortality.

Fires can burn at three elevation levels. Ground fires will burn through soil that is rich in organic matter. Surface fires will burn through living and dead plant material at ground level. Crown fires will burn through the tops of shrubs and trees. Ecosystems generally experience a mix of all three.

Fires will often break out during a dry season, but in some areas wildfires also commonly occur during times of year when lightning is prevalent. The frequency over a span of years at which fire will occur at a particular location is a measure of how common wildfires are in a given ecosystem. It is either defined as the average interval between fires at a given site, or the average interval between fires in an equivalent specified area.

Defined as the energy released per unit length of fireline (kW m^{−1}), wildfire intensity can be estimated either as

- the product of
  - the linear spread rate (m s^{−1}),
  - the low heat of combustion (kJ kg^{−1}),
  - and the combusted fuel mass per unit area,
- or it can be estimated from the flame length.

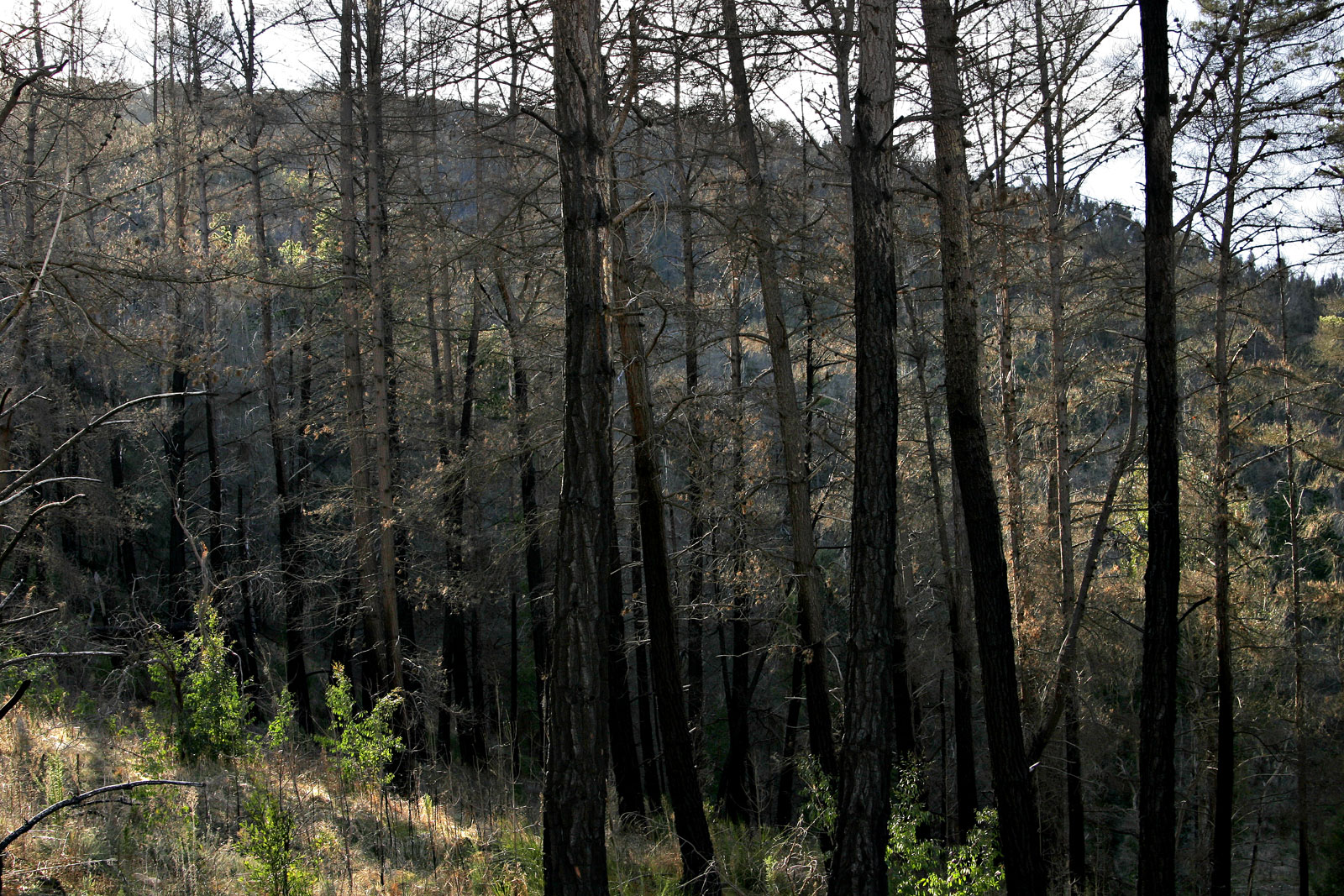
Radiata pine plantation burnt during the 2003 Eastern Victorian alpine bushfires, Australia

== Abiotic responses ==
Fires can affect soils through heating and combustion processes. Depending on the temperatures of the soils during the combustion process, different effects will happen- from evaporation of water at the lower temperature ranges, to the combustion of soil organic matter and the formation of pyrogenic organic matter, such as charcoal.

Fires can cause changes in soil nutrients through a variety of mechanisms, which include oxidation, volatilization, erosion, and leaching by water, but the event must usually be of high temperatures for significant loss of nutrients to occur. However, the quantity of bioavailable nutrients in the soil usually increases due to the ash that is generated, as compared to the slow release of nutrients by decomposition. Rock spalling (or thermal exfoliation) accelerates weathering of rock and potentially the release of some nutrients.

An increase in the pH of the soil following a fire is commonly observed, most likely due to the formation and subsequent decomposition of calcium carbonate to calcium oxide when temperatures get even higher. It could also be due to the increased cation content in the soil due to the ash, which temporarily increases soil pH. Microbial activity in the soil might also increase due to the heating of soil and increased nutrient content in the soil, though studies have also found complete loss of microbes on the top layer of soil after a fire. Overall, soils become more basic (higher pH) following fires because of acid combustion. By driving novel chemical reactions at high temperatures, fire can even alter the texture and structure of soils by affecting the clay content and the soil's porosity.

Removal of vegetation following a fire can cause several effects on the soil, such as increasing the temperatures of the soil during the day due to increased solar radiation on the soil surface, and greater cooling due to loss of radiative heat at night. Less plant matter to intercept rain will allow more to reach the soil surface, and with fewer plants to absorb the water, the amount of water content in the soils might increase. However, ash can be water repellent when dry, and therefore water content and availability might not actually increase.

== Biotic responses and adaptations ==
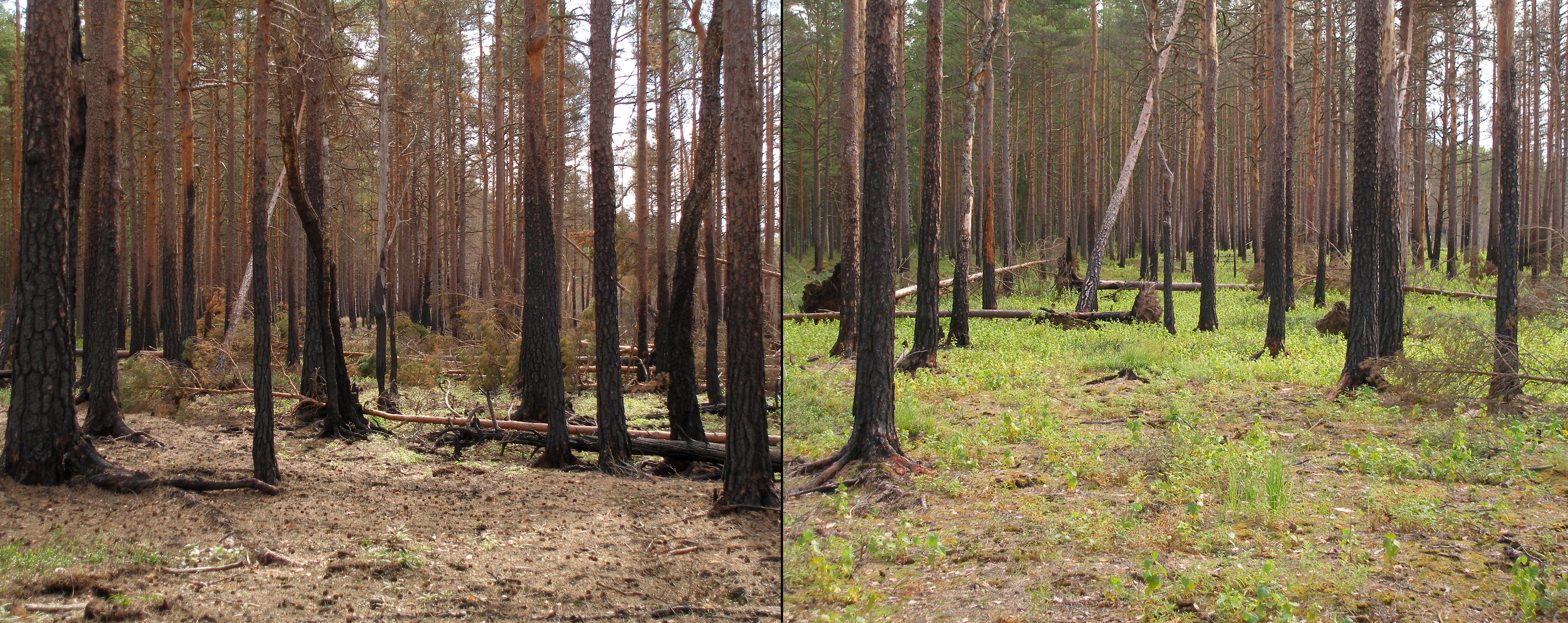
Ecological succession after a wildfire in a boreal pine forest next to Hara Bog, Lahemaa National Park, Estonia. The pictures were taken one and two years after the fire.

Fire adaptations are traits of plants and animals that help them survive wildfire or to use resources created by wildfire. These traits can help plants and animals increase their survival rates during a fire and/or reproduce offspring after a fire. Both plants and animals have multiple strategies for surviving and reproducing after fire. Plants in wildfire-prone ecosystems often survive through adaptations to their local fire regime. Such adaptations include physical protection against heat, increased growth after a fire event, and flammable materials that encourage fire and may eliminate competition.

For example, plants of the genus Eucalyptus contain flammable oils that encourage fire and hard sclerophyll leaves to resist heat and drought, ensuring their dominance over less fire-tolerant species. Dense bark, shedding lower branches, and high water content in external structures may also protect trees from rising temperatures. Fire-resistant seeds and reserve shoots that sprout after a fire encourage species preservation, as embodied by pioneer species. Smoke, charred wood, and heat can stimulate the germination of seeds in a process called serotiny. Exposure to smoke from burning plants promotes germination in other types of plants by inducing the production of the orange butenolide.

Fires have also allowed for surviving species to create adaptations post-fire. This allows for better survival post-fire and furthers establishment. Adaptations as an example for boreal forests can include thick bark and post-fire flowering that is directly linked to fires. Other examples of species outside of plants and trees allow for further adaptation post-fire to survive and regenerate their population. This allows for better dispersal and new dispersal patterns to create a more stable environment. Vegetation, as an example, showed that it had greater gene flow than when unburnt and undisturbed.

=== Plants ===
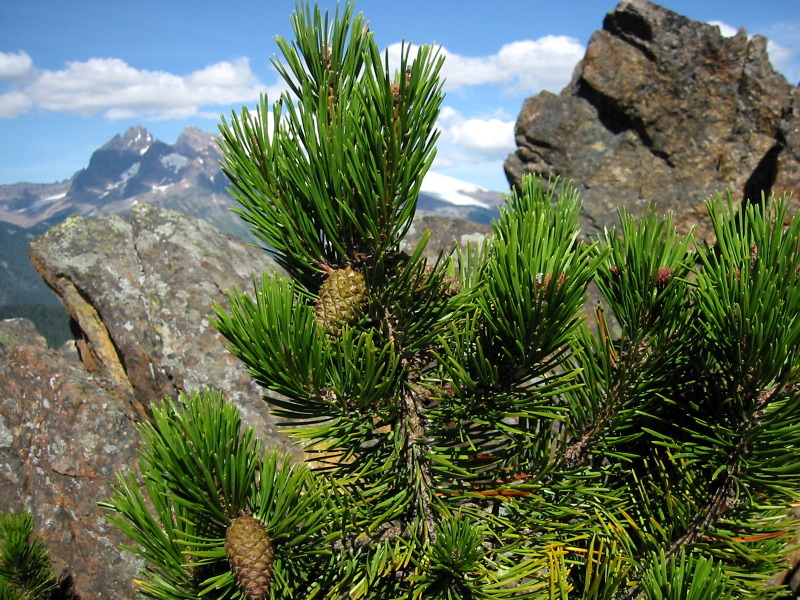
Lodgepole pine cones

Plants have evolved many adaptations to cope with fire. Of these adaptations, one of the best-known is likely pyriscence, where maturation and release of seeds is triggered, in whole or in part, by fire or smoke; this behaviour is often erroneously called serotiny, although this term truly denotes the much broader category of seed release activated by any stimulus. All pyriscent plants are serotinous, but not all serotinous plants are pyriscent (some are necriscent, hygriscent, xeriscent, soliscent, or some combination thereof). On the other hand, germination of seed activated by trigger is not to be confused with pyriscence; it is known as physiological dormancy.

In chaparral communities in Southern California, for example, some plants have leaves coated in flammable oils that encourage an intense fire. This heat causes their fire-activated seeds to germinate (an example of dormancy) and the young plants can then capitalize on the lack of competition in a burnt landscape. Other plants have smoke-activated seeds, or fire-activated buds. The cones of the Lodgepole pine (Pinus contorta) are, conversely, pyriscent: they are sealed with a resin that a fire melts away, releasing the seeds. Many plant species, including the shade-intolerant giant sequoia (Sequoiadendron giganteum), require fire to make gaps in the vegetation canopy that will let in light, allowing their seedlings to compete with the more shade-tolerant seedlings of other species, and so establish themselves. Because their stationary nature precludes any fire avoidance, plant species may only be fire-intolerant, fire-tolerant or fire-resistant.

==== Fire intolerance ====
Fire-intolerant plant species tend to be highly flammable and are destroyed completely by fire. Some of these plants and their seeds may simply fade from the community after a fire and not return; others have adapted to ensure that their offspring survives into the next generation. "Obligate seeders" are plants with large, fire-activated seed banks that germinate, grow, and mature rapidly following a fire, in order to reproduce and renew the seed bank before the next fire. Seeds may contain the receptor protein KAI2, that is activated by the growth hormones karrikin released by the fire.

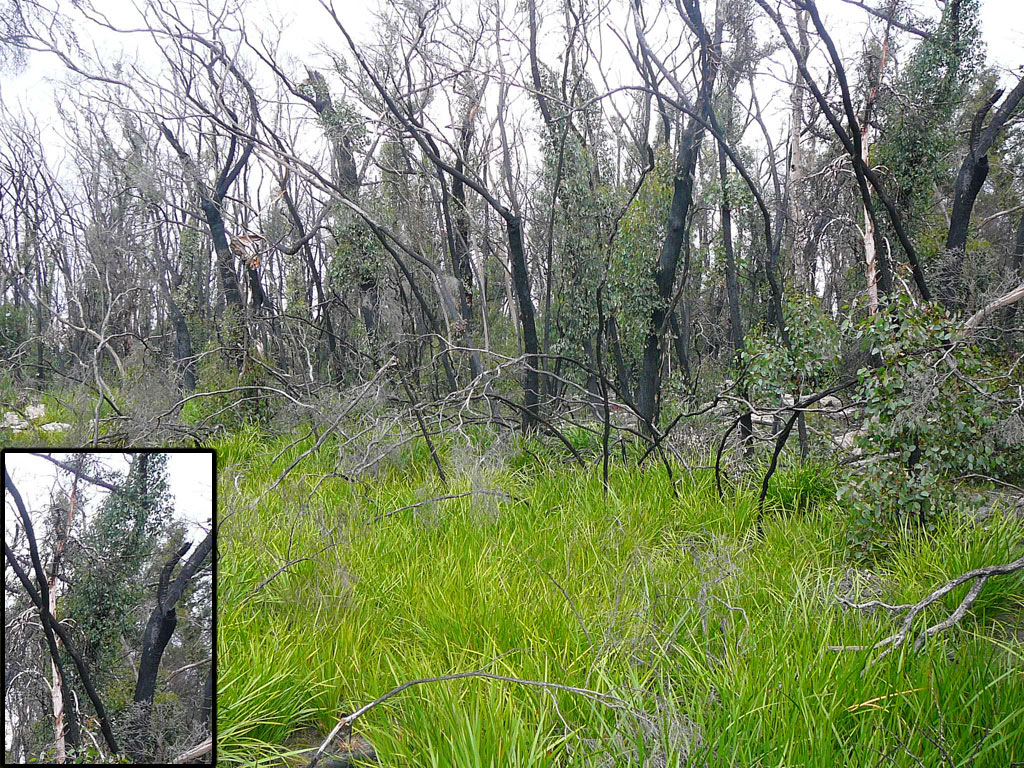
Fire tolerance. Typical regrowth after an Australian bushfire.

==== Fire tolerance ====
Fire-tolerant species are able to withstand a degree of burning and continue growing despite damage from fire. These plants are sometimes referred to as "resprouters". Ecologists have shown that some species of resprouters store extra energy in their roots to aid recovery and re-growth following a fire. For example, after an Australian bushfire, the Mountain Grey Gum tree (Eucalyptus cypellocarpa) starts producing a mass of shoots of leaves from the base of the tree all the way up the trunk towards the top, making it look like a black stick completely covered with young, green leaves.

==== Fire resistance ====
Fire-resistant plants suffer little damage during a characteristic fire regime. These include large trees whose flammable parts are high above surface fires. Mature ponderosa pine (Pinus ponderosa) is an example of a tree species that suffers little to no crown damage during a low severity fire because it sheds its lower, vulnerable branches as it matures.

=== Animals, birds and microbes ===
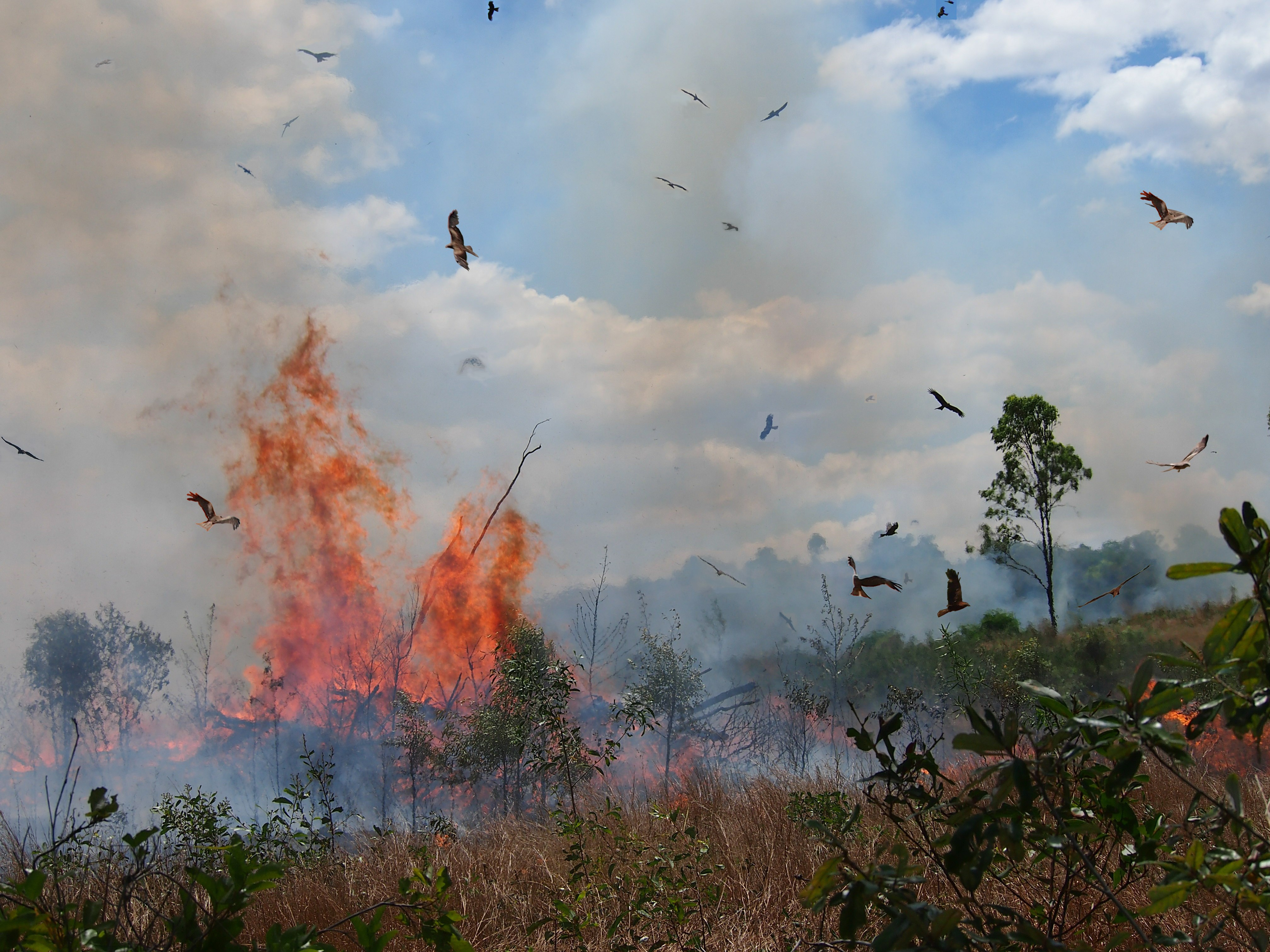
A mixed flock of hawks hunting in and around a bushfire

Like plants, animals display a range of abilities to cope with fire, but they differ from most plants in that they must avoid the actual fire to survive. Although birds may be vulnerable when nesting, they are generally able to escape a fire; indeed they often profit from being able to take prey fleeing from a fire and to recolonize burned areas quickly afterwards. In fact, many wildlife species globally are dependent on recurring fires in fire-dependent ecosystems to create and maintain habitat. Some anthropological and ethno-ornithological evidence suggests that certain species of fire-foraging raptors may engage in intentional fire propagation to flush out prey. Mammals are often capable of fleeing a fire, or seeking cover if they can burrow. Amphibians and reptiles may avoid flames by burrowing into the ground or using the burrows of other animals. Amphibians in particular are able to take refuge in water or very wet mud.

Some arthropods also take shelter during a fire, although the heat and smoke may actually attract some of them, to their peril. Microbial organisms in the soil vary in their heat tolerance but are more likely to be able to survive a fire the deeper they are in the soil. A low fire intensity, a quick passing of the flames and a dry soil will also help. An increase in available nutrients after the fire has passed may result in larger microbial communities than before the fire. The generally greater heat tolerance of bacteria relative to fungi makes it possible for soil microbial population diversity to change following a fire, depending on the severity of the fire, the depth of the microbes in the soil, and the presence of plant cover. Certain species of fungi, such as Cylindrocarpon destructans appear to be unaffected by combustion contaminants, which can inhibit re-population of burnt soil by other microorganisms, and therefore have a higher chance of surviving fire disturbance and then recolonizing and out-competing other fungal species afterwards.

== Fire and ecological succession ==
Fire behavior is different in every ecosystem and the organisms in those ecosystems have adapted accordingly. One sweeping generality is that in all ecosystems, fire creates a mosaic of different habitat patches, with areas ranging from those having just been burned to those that have been untouched by fire for many years. This is a form of ecological succession in which a freshly burned site will progress through continuous and directional phases of colonization following the destruction caused by the fire. Ecologists usually characterize succession through the changes in vegetation that successively arise. After a fire, the first species to re-colonize will be those with seeds are already present in the soil, or those with seeds are able to travel into the burned area quickly. These are generally fast-growing herbaceous plants that require light and are intolerant of shading. As time passes, more slowly growing, shade-tolerant woody species will suppress some of the herbaceous plants. Conifers are often early successional species, while broad leaf trees frequently replace them in the absence of fire. Hence, many conifer forests are themselves dependent upon recurring fire. Both natural and human fires affect all ecosystems from peatlands to shrublands to forests and tropical landscapes. This impacts the way that the ecosystem is structured and functions. Though there have always been wildfires naturally, the frequency of wildfires has increased at a rapid rate in recent years. This is largely due to decreases in precipitation, increases in temperature, and increases in human ignitions.

Different species of plants, animals, and microbes specialize in exploiting different stages in this process of succession, and by creating these different types of patches, fire allows a greater number of species to exist within a landscape. Soil characteristics will be a factor in determining the specific nature of a fire-adapted ecosystem, as will climate and topography. Different frequencies of fire also result in different successional pathways; short intervals between fires often eliminate tree species due to the time required to rebuild a seed bank, resulting in replacement by lighter seeded species like grasses and forbs.

== Genetic Diversity ==
=== Genetic Tools ===
Fire regime has a range of impacts on genetic trends by influencing reproduction, survival, natural selection, and dispersal in individuals, populations, and metapopulations.. Genetic and genomic tools can be used to understand fire's evolutionary role in individuals and populations. The study of genes and their role in inheritance is called genetics. Genetics focuses on how genes direct cell activity and body functions through the proteins they instruct for. Genomics, on the other hand, studies all of the genes within an individual and how that unit of heredity interacts with the individual's environment and with other genes.

A few of these genetic technologies are microsatellites (STRs), single-nucleotide polymorphisms (SNPs), and mitochondrial and nuclear genomic sequencing data. STRs allow for genetic variation to be tracked across populations. This is done using short sequences of repeating nucleotides and comparing these sequences across a population. Providing further knowledge of how the disturbance of fire affects population structure and genetic diversity over an immediate and long-term period. SNPs are another method for tracking small DNA changes that show how gene patterns change over time. SNPs are used more to study populations across different regions that display varying fire regimes. This enables the understanding of how fire tolerances are adapted across populations.

Mitochondrial and nuclear genomic sequencing data can be used to comprehend both the short-term adaptive responses and the long-term evolutionary effects of fire pressures. Mitochondrial sequencing data can be used to study recent genetic variations in female lineages. Nuclear genomic sequencing, although more susceptible to damage from intense heat, is used to study the entire population's history of adaptations from the combination of maternal and paternal genetic inheritance.

=== Biodiversity ===
The influence of fire on biodiversity is complex and varies depending on the ecosystem and context of the disturbance. Mortality, immigration, accessibility to affected habitat, fire intensity, and adaptations of species are examples of factors that influence the biodiversity of an area post-disturbance.

In some cases, fires reduce genetic diversity. High mortality rates caused by a fire may result in a population bottleneck. This reduces a species' gene pool and may result in decreased genetic diversity in that species, especially if immigration to the disturbed area after the fire is low. The increased occurrence of large and intense fires may also have an effect on biodiversity in burned areas. While more research is needed to understand the effects of these types of fires, some studies suggest they may have a negative impact on biodiversity, especially the effects of human-induced wildfires on species in tropical or temperate broad leaved forests. Wildfires can also promote invasive species, which force out native species and decrease biodiversity by altering nutrients such as nitrogen in the environment.

In other cases, fire can increase biodiversity. Many ecosystems rely on fire or other disturbances to drive succession and biodiversity. Organisms living in these ecosystems have adaptations to help them survive fires. For example, some plant species can re-establish themselves post-fire by resprouting. The ability to resprout leads to various mutations accruing within individuals because this trait is hereditary. This can result in beneficial combinations of genes and quicker adaptations. Large, intense fires can be harmful to biodiversity, but smaller, less intense fires can promote biodiversity. These smaller-scale disturbances promote heterogeneity of ecosystems. These heterogenous habitats created by fire disturbances can create niches that promote biodiversity.

== Species Richness ==
Species richness is at its peak post-fire but steadily declines over time. Post-fire endurance for certain species allows for a variety of different life histories to exist at the same time. Fires result in a change of biodiversity by reducing the population for the promotion of growth for species. Disturbances due to fire allow for an alternative recovery process for certain animal populations, which can result in recolonization and population growth. Post-fire has decreased the abundance of species and the result of extinction. The effects of burning depend on the size, timing, and severity of the burn. The increased frequency and the size of a fire can impact how a population recovers between other fire events, which causes a patch between population distributions. Fires have been used to alter species composition, such as suppressing species that are invasive.

== Examples of fire in different ecosystems ==
=== Forests ===
Mild to moderate fires burn in the forest understory, removing small trees and herbaceous groundcover. High-severity fires will burn into the crowns of the trees and kill most of the dominant vegetation. Crown fires may require support from ground fuels to maintain the fire in the forest canopy (passive crown fires), or the fire may burn in the canopy independently of any ground fuel support (an active crown fire). High-severity fire creates complex early seral forest habitat, or snag forest with high levels of biodiversity. When a forest burns frequently and thus has less plant litter build-up, below-ground soil temperatures rise only slightly and will not be lethal to roots that lie deep in the soil. Although other characteristics of a forest will influence the impact of fire upon it, factors such as climate and topography play an important role in determining fire severity and fire extent. Fires spread most widely during drought years, are most severe on upper slopes and are influenced by the type of vegetation that is growing.

==== Forests in British Columbia ====
British Columbia represents about 10% of the land area of Canada and yet harbours 70% of the bird and terrestrial mammal species which breed there. Natural fire regimes are important in maintaining a diverse assemblage of vertebrate species in up to twelve different forest types in British Columbia. Different species have adapted to exploit the different stages of succession, regrowth and habitat change that occurs following an episode of burning, such as downed trees and debris. The characteristics of the initial fire, such as its size and intensity, cause the habitat to evolve differentially afterwards and influence how vertebrate species are able to use the burned areas. The change in forest fire intensity over time has been studied for the period since 1600 in an area of central British Columbia and is consistent with fire suppression since regulation was introduced.

==== Siberian Taiga ====
The northern part of the Siberian Taiga, in northern Asia, is covered in permafrost and has minimal human settlements. Larch covers about 80% of the permafrost-zone forested area and has the highest burned area out of all the forest types in the Siberian Taiga, with a relative burned area at 1.13% per year from 1996 to 2019. Wildfires are a natural process in this area, and, particularly in the northern region, are commonly ignited by lightning. Fires in the northern region promote larch growth by clearing the moss ground cover. This process increases the seasonal thawing, adds nutrients to the ground, and gives seeds access to the soil.

=== Shrublands ===
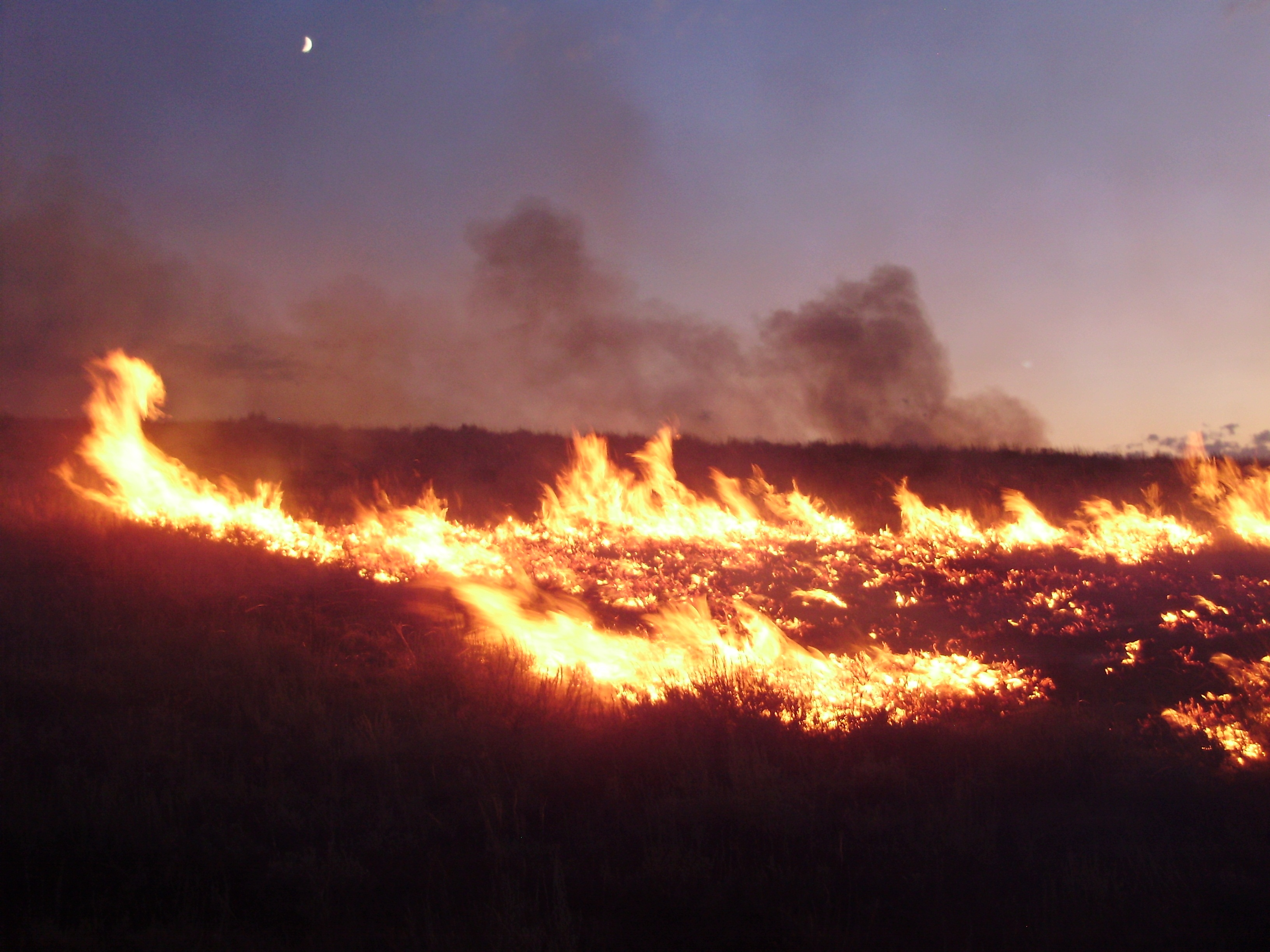
Lightning-sparked wildfires are frequent occurrences on shrublands and grasslands in Nevada.

Shrub fires typically concentrate in the canopy and spread continuously if the shrubs are close enough together. Shrublands are typically dry and are prone to accumulations of highly volatile fuels, especially on hillsides. Fires will follow the path of least moisture and the greatest amount of dead fuel material. Surface and below-ground soil temperatures during a burn are generally higher than those of forest fires because the centers of combustion lie closer to the ground, although this can vary greatly. Common plants in shrubland or chaparral include manzanita, chamise and coyote brush.

==== California shrublands ====
California shrubland, commonly known as chaparral, is a widespread plant community of low growing species, typically on arid sloping areas of the California Coast Ranges or western foothills of the Sierra Nevada. There are a number of common shrubs and tree shrub forms in this association, including salal, toyon, coffeeberry and Western poison oak. Regeneration following a fire is usually a major factor in the association of these species.

==== South African Fynbos shrublands ====
Fynbos shrublands occur in a small belt across South Africa. The plant species in this ecosystem are highly diverse, yet the majority of these species are obligate seeders, that is, a fire will cause germination of the seeds and the plants will begin a new life-cycle because of it. These plants may have coevolved into obligate seeders as a response to fire and nutrient-poor soils. Because fire is common in this ecosystem and the soil has limited nutrients, it is most efficient for plants to produce many seeds and then die in the next fire. Investing a lot of energy in roots to survive the next fire when those roots will be able to extract little extra benefit from the nutrient-poor soil would be less efficient. It is possible that the rapid generation time that these obligate seeders display has led to more rapid evolution and speciation in this ecosystem, resulting in its highly diverse plant community.

=== Grasslands ===
Grasslands burn more readily than forest and shrub ecosystems, with the fire moving through the stems and leaves of herbaceous plants and only lightly heating the underlying soil, even in cases of high intensity. In most grassland ecosystems, fire is the primary mode of decomposition, making it crucial in the recycling of nutrients. In some grassland systems, fire only became the primary mode of decomposition after the disappearance of large migratory herds of browsing or grazing megafauna driven by predator pressure. In the absence of functional communities of large migratory herds of herbivorous megafauna and attendant predators, overuse of fire to maintain grassland ecosystems may lead to excessive oxidation, loss of carbon, and desertification in susceptible climates. Some grassland ecosystems respond poorly to fire.

==== North American grasslands ====
In North America fire-adapted invasive grasses such as Bromus tectorum contribute to increased fire frequency which exerts selective pressure against native species. This is a concern for grasslands in the Western United States.

In less arid grasslands, prior to their displacement by white settlers, Native Americans used fires in concert with grazing of bison, to create a healthy grassland ecosystem, as indicated by the accumulation of soil organic matter significantly altered by fire. The tallgrass prairie ecosystem in the Flint Hills of eastern Kansas and Oklahoma is responding positively to the current use of fire in combination with grazing.

==== South African savanna ====
In the savanna of South Africa, recently burned areas have new growth that provides palatable and nutritious forage compared to older, tougher grasses. This new forage attracts large herbivores from areas of unburned and grazed grassland that has been kept short by constant grazing. On these unburned "lawns", only those plant species adapted to heavy grazing are able to persist; but the distraction provided by the newly burned areas allows grazing-intolerant grasses to grow back into the lawns that have been temporarily abandoned, so allowing these species to persist within that ecosystem.

=== Longleaf pine savannas ===
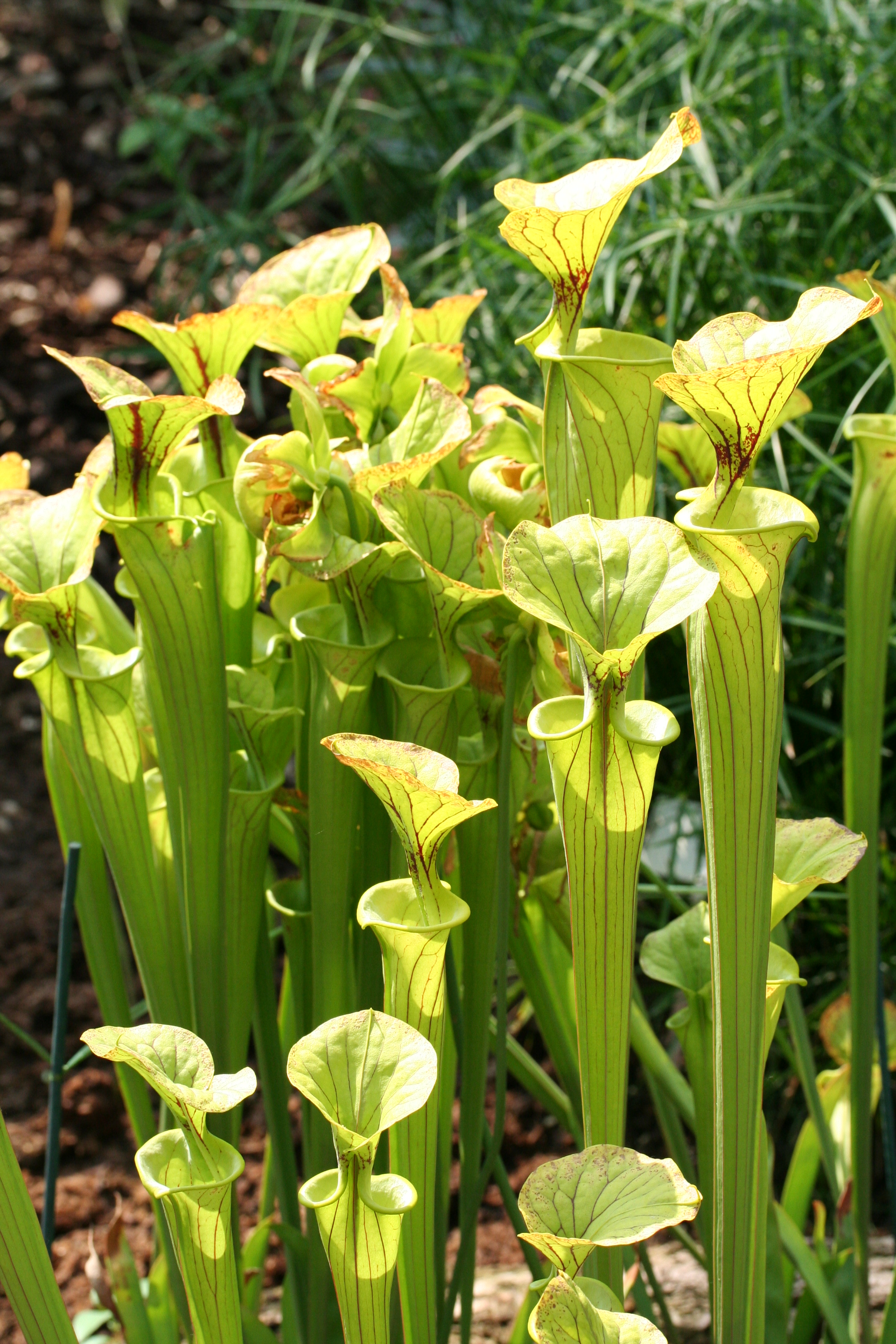
Yellow pitcher plant is dependent upon recurring fire in coastal plain savannas and flatwoods.

Much of the southeastern United States was once open longleaf pine forest with a rich understory of grasses, sedges, carnivorous plants and orchids. These ecosystems had the highest fire frequency of any habitat, once per decade or less. Without fire, deciduous forest trees invade, and their shade eliminates both the pines and the understory. Some of the typical plants associated with fire include yellow pitcher plant and rose pogonia. The abundance and diversity of such plants is closely related to fire frequency. Rare animals such as gopher tortoises and indigo snakes also depend upon these open grasslands and flatwoods. Hence, the restoration of fire is a priority to maintain species composition and biological diversity.

=== Fire in wetlands ===
Many kinds of wetlands are also influenced by fire. This usually occurs during periods of drought. In landscapes with peat soils, such as bogs, the peat substrate itself may burn, leaving holes that refill with water as new ponds. Fires that are less intense will remove accumulated litter and allow other wetland plants to regenerate from buried seeds, or from rhizomes. Wetlands that are influenced by fire include coastal marshes, wet prairies, peat bogs, floodplains, prairie marshes and flatwoods. Since wetlands can store large amounts of carbon in peat, the fire frequency of vast northern peatlands is linked to processes controlling the carbon dioxide levels of the atmosphere, and to the phenomenon of global warming. Dissolved organic carbon (DOC) is abundant in wetlands and plays a critical role in their ecology. In the Florida Everglades, a significant portion of the DOC is "dissolved charcoal" indicating that fire can play a critical role in wetland ecosystems.

== Fire suppression ==
Fire serves many important functions within fire-adapted ecosystems. Fire plays an important role in nutrient cycling, diversity maintenance and habitat structure. The suppression of fire can lead to unforeseen changes in ecosystems that often adversely affect the plants, animals and humans that depend upon that habitat. Wildfires that deviate from a historical fire regime because of fire suppression are called "uncharacteristic fires".

=== Chaparral communities ===
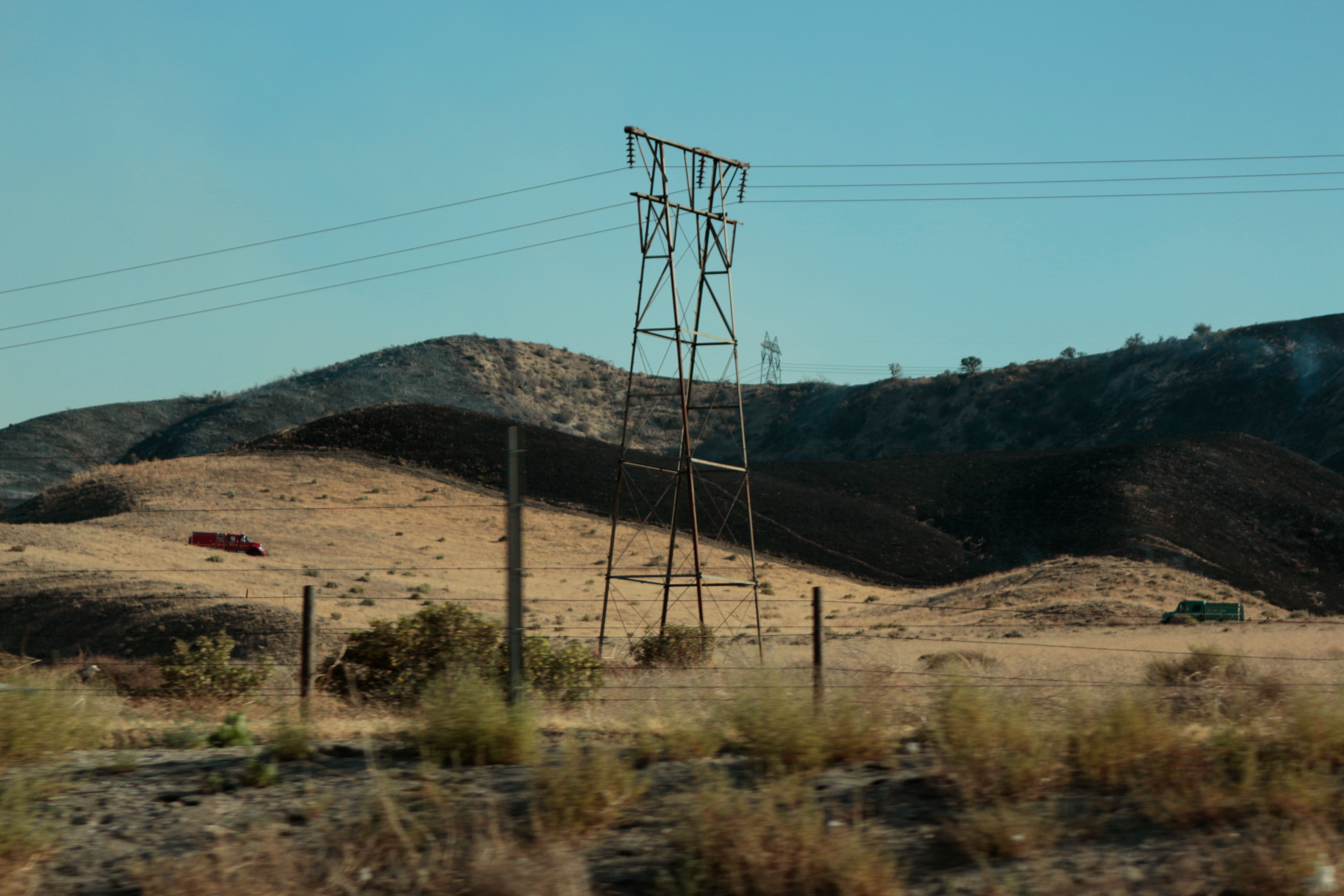
A fire engine approaching smoldering brush at the Tumbleweed Fire near Los Angeles in July 2021

In 2003, southern California witnessed powerful chaparral wildfires. Hundreds of homes and hundreds of thousands of acres of land went up in flames. Extreme fire weather (low humidity, low fuel moisture and high winds) and the accumulation of dead plant material from eight years of drought, contributed to a catastrophic outcome. Although some have maintained that fire suppression contributed to an unnatural buildup of fuel loads, a detailed analysis of historical fire data has showed that this may not have been the case. Fire suppression activities had failed to exclude fire from the southern California chaparral. Research showing differences in fire size and frequency between southern California and Baja has been used to imply that the larger fires north of the border are the result of fire suppression, but this opinion has been challenged by numerous investigators and ecologists.

One consequence of the fires in 2003 has been the increased density of invasive and non-native plant species that have quickly colonized burned areas, especially those that had already been burned in the previous 15 years. Because shrubs in these communities are adapted to a particular historical fire regime, altered fire regimes may change the selective pressures on plants and favor invasive and non-native species that are better able to exploit the novel post-fire conditions.

=== Fish impacts ===
The Boise National Forest is a US national forest located north and east of the city of Boise, Idaho. Following several uncharacteristically large wildfires, an immediately negative impact on fish populations was observed, posing particular danger to small and isolated fish populations. In the long term, however, fire appears to rejuvenate fish habitats by causing hydraulic changes that increase flooding and lead to silt removal and the deposition of a favorable habitat substrate. This leads to larger post-fire populations of the fish that are able to recolonize these improved areas.

== Fire as a management tool ==
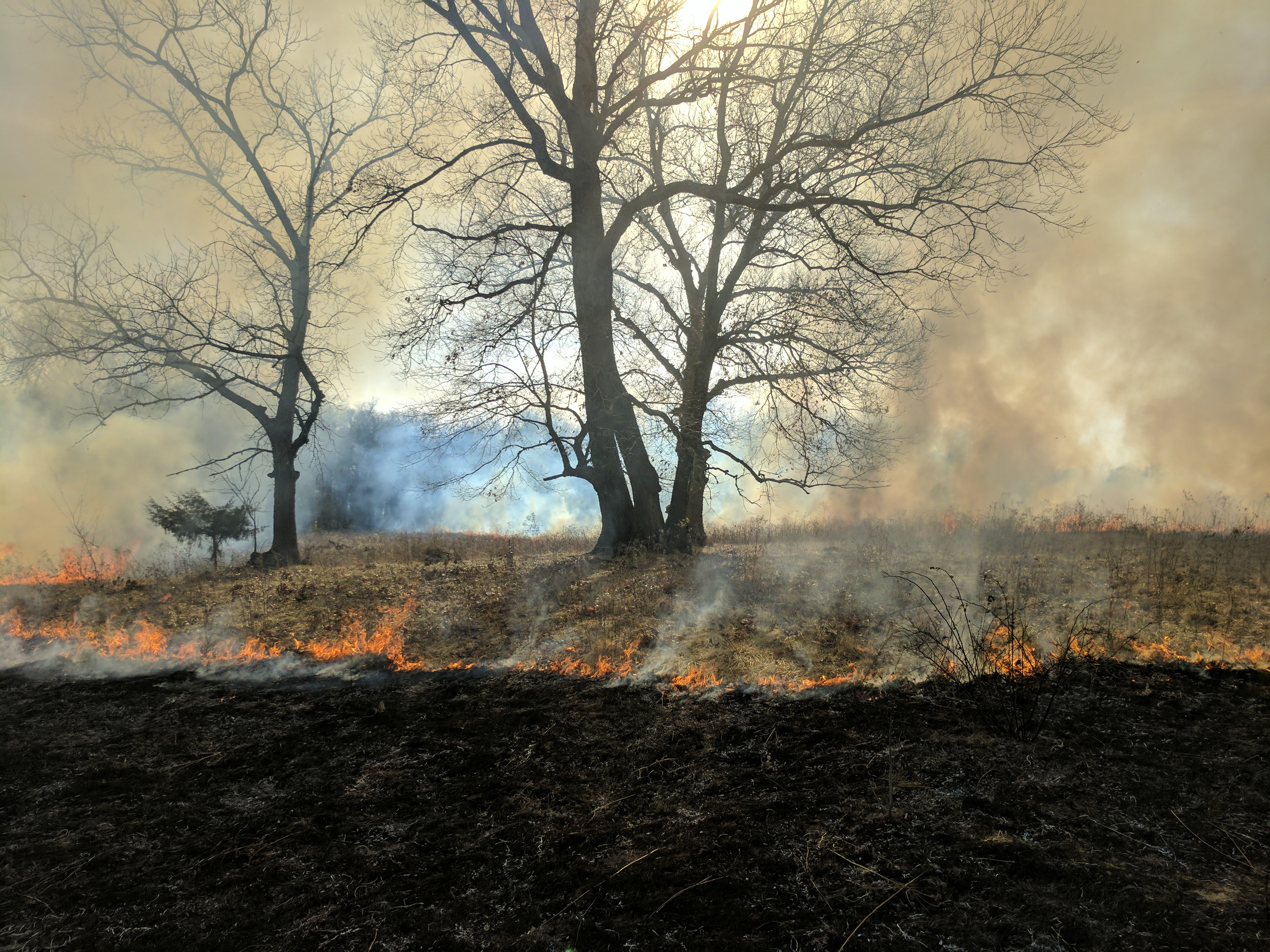
Prescribed Burn in Oak Savannah in Iowa

Restoration ecology is the name given to an attempt to reverse or mitigate some of the changes that humans have caused to an ecosystem. Controlled burning is one tool that is currently receiving considerable attention as a means of restoration and management. Applying fire to an ecosystem may create habitats for species that have been negatively impacted by fire suppression, or fire may be used as a way of controlling invasive species without resorting to herbicides or pesticides. However, there is debate as to what land managers should aim to restore their ecosystems to, especially as to whether it be pre-human or pre-European conditions. Native American use of fire, along with natural fire, historically maintained the diversity of the savannas of North America.

=== U.S. Oak Savannas and Oak Woodlands ===
Oak savannas and oak woodlands historically expanded across the Midwest, creating a transitional zone between the eastern deciduous forested United States and the Great Plains tall grass prairie region. However, due to human impact, these ecosystems are now some of the most degraded ecosystems in the world. Roughly around <1% of original savanna habitats remain in the United States, making conservation and preservation of these habitats extremely important. Management of these scarce ecosystems will assist in conserving native communities and biodiversity by providing habitat for wildlife and plant species.

Habitats are characterized by the domination of oak species, lack a woody midstory, and possess a diverse ground coverage community of grasses, forbs, and sedges. Fire plays an important role in keeping these ecosystem types healthy. The topography of the Midwest consists of rolling hills and open plains. Fire historically would have run through these landscapes, creating a mosaic of prairie, savanna, and woodland habitat types due to the varying intensity and frequency of fire across varying landscapes. Woodlands would have been more prominent in hillier regions, while oak savannas would have been the transition out of the hill country and into the Great Plains region.

The overstory canopy of oak species is key in defining these habitats. Oak savannas have a canopy that is around 10-30% coverage, while oak woodlands have a canopy that can reach up to 80% coverage. This is calculated by using a densitometer, which is a handheld device that measures the ratio of tree coverage compared to open sky. Due to the increase in fire suppression, the lack of large grazers, and agricultural landscape conversion, these communities have been transformed into degraded habitats that have a dense canopy cover, a lack of ground diversity, and an increase in invasive species. One goal in restoring these ecosystems is to open the canopy through the removal of midstory species and possible canopy cover species. After the reduction of tree density and canopy cover, prescribed fire is used to hinder woody encroachment, create a desirable place of development for seed germination, and remove excessive ground litter.

Fire regime plays an important role in the restoration of oak savannas and oak woodlands and depends greatly on the desired outcomes from management. Desired outcomes can consist of the reduction of canopy cover, midstory, or small woodies, promoting and protecting oak sapling growth, or favoring forbs over grasses or vice versa. Choosing when to burn, how intensely to burn, and how often to burn are major questions when managing these ecosystems. In addition to prescribed fire, using herbicides, grazers, and browsers can increase biodiversity and resiliency. Herbicides can be used to control invasive species and to prevent regrowth from harvested trees. Choosing an herbicide that has low persistence and mobility in the soil will help prevent the effects on nearby organisms and pollution of groundwater, minimizing the risk of environmental contamination. In addition, grazers such as bison and browsers such as white-tailed deer can contribute to increasing the heterogeneity of these ecosystems, meaning that the landscape has more varied physical features. Using the combination of these practices is key in management of oak savannas and oak woodlands.

=== Great Plains shortgrass prairie ===
A combination of heavy livestock grazing and fire-suppression has drastically altered the structure, composition, and diversity of the shortgrass prairie ecosystem on the Great Plains, allowing woody species to dominate many areas and promoting fire-intolerant invasive species. In semi-arid ecosystems where the decomposition of woody material is slow, fire is crucial for returning nutrients to the soil and allowing the grasslands to maintain their high productivity.

Although fire can occur during the growing or the dormant seasons, managed fire during the dormant season is most effective at increasing the grass and forb cover, biodiversity and plant nutrient uptake in shortgrass prairies. Managers must also take into account, however, how invasive and non-native species respond to fire if they want to restore the integrity of a native ecosystem. For example, fire can only control the invasive spotted knapweed (Centaurea maculosa) on the Michigan tallgrass prairie in the summer, because this is the time in the knapweed's life cycle that is most important to its reproductive growth.

=== Mixed conifer forests in the US Sierra Nevada ===
Mixed conifer forests in the United States Sierra Nevada used to have fire return intervals that ranged from 5 years up to 300 years, depending on the locale. Lower elevations tended to have more frequent fire return intervals, whilst higher and wetter sites saw longer intervals between fires. Native Americans tended to set fires during fall and winter, and land at higher elevations was generally occupied by Native Americans only during the summer.

=== Finnish boreal forests ===
The decline of habitat area and quality has caused many species populations to be red-listed by the International Union for Conservation of Nature. According to a study on forest management of Finnish boreal forests, improving the habitat quality of areas outside reserves can help in conservation efforts of endangered deadwood-dependent beetles. These beetles and various types of fungi both need dead trees in order to survive. Old growth forests can provide this particular habitat. However, most Fennoscandian boreal forested areas are used for timber and therefore are unprotected. The use of controlled burning and tree retention of a forested area with deadwood was studied and its effect on the endangered beetles. The study found that after the first year of management the number of species increased in abundance and richness compared to pre-fire treatment. The abundance of beetles continued to increase the following year in sites where tree retention was high and deadwood was abundant. The correlation between forest fire management and increased beetle populations shows a key to conserving these red-listed species.

=== Australian eucalypt forests ===
Much of the old growth eucalypt forest in Australia is designated for conservation. Management of these forests is important because species like Eucalyptus grandis rely on fire to survive. There are a few eucalypt species that do not have a lignotuber, a root swelling structure that contains buds where new shoots can then sprout. During a fire a lignotuber is helpful in the reestablishment of the plant. Because some eucalypts do not have this particular mechanism, forest fire management can be helpful by creating rich soil, killing competitors, and allowing seeds to be released.

== See also ==
- Crown sprouting
- Evolutionary history of plants
- Fire history
- Fire-stick farming
- Peat bog fire
- Post-fire hillslope stabilization treatments
- Pyrophyte
- Keystone species reintroduction: (sufficient) native keystone grazing species in grasslands will promote tree growth, reducing wildfire likelihood

== Bibliography ==
- Archibald, S., W.J. Bond, W.D. Stock and D.H.K. Fairbanks. 2005. "Shaping the landscape: fire-grazer interactions in an African Savanna". Ecological Applications 15:96–109.
- Beaty, M.R.; Taylor, A.H. (2001). "Spatial and temporal variation of fire regimes in a mixed conifer forest landscape, Southern Cascades, California, USA". Journal of Biogeography. 28 (8): 955–966. Bibcode:2001JBiog..28..955B. doi:10.1046/j.1365-2699.2001.00591.x. S2CID 12103934.
- Begon, M., J.L. Harper and C.R. Townsend. (1996). Ecology: individuals, populations, and communities, 3rd. ed., Blackwell Science Ltd., Cambridge, MA.
- Bond, W. J.; Keeley, J. E. (2005). "Fire as a global 'herbivore': the ecology and evolution of flammable ecosystems". Trends in Ecology & Evolution. 20 (7): 387–394. doi:10.1016/j.tree.2005.04.025. PMID 16701401.
- Brockway, D.G.; Gatewood, R.G.; Paris, R.B. (2002). "Restoring fire as an ecological process in shortgrass prairie ecosystems: initial effects of prescribed burning during the dormant and growing seasons". Journal of Environmental Management. 65 (2): 135–152. Bibcode:2002JEnvM..65..135B. doi:10.1006/jema.2002.0540. PMID 12197076. S2CID 15695486.
- Bunnell, F.L. (1995). "Forest-dwelling vertebrate faunas and natural fire regimes in British Columbia: patterns and implications for conservation". Conservation Biology. 9 (3): 636–644. Bibcode:1995ConBi...9..636B. doi:10.1046/j.1523-1739.1995.09030636.x.
- DeBano, L.F., D.G. Neary, P.F. Ffolliot. (1998). Fire's Effects on Ecosystems. John Wiley & Sons, Inc., New York.
- Dellasala, D.A.; Williams, J.E.; Williams, C.D.; Franklin, J.F. (2004). "Beyond smoke and mirrors: a synthesis of fire policy and science". Conservation Biology. 18 (4): 976–986. Bibcode:2004ConBi..18..976D. doi:10.1111/j.1523-1739.2004.00529.x. S2CID 84102393.
- Emery, S.M.; Gross, K.L. (2005). "Effects of timing of prescribed fire on the demography of an invasive plant, spotted knapweed Centaurea maculosa". Journal of Applied Ecology. 42 (1): 60–69. Bibcode:2005JApEc..42...60E. doi:10.1111/j.1365-2664.2004.00990.x.
- Fairbrother, A.; Turnley, J. G. (2005). "Predicting risks of uncharacteristic wildfires: application of the risk assessment process". Forest Ecology and Management. 211 (1–2): 28–35. Bibcode:2005ForEM.211...28F. doi:10.1016/j.foreco.2005.01.026.
- Hart, S. C.; DeLuca, T. H.; Newman, G. S.; MacKenzie, M. D.; Boyle, S. I. (2005). "Post-fire vegetative dynamics as drivers of microbial community structure and function in forest soils". Forest Ecology and Management. 220 (1–3): 166–184. Bibcode:2005ForEM.220..166H. doi:10.1016/j.foreco.2005.08.012.
- Keddy, P.A. 2007. Plants and Vegetation: Origins, Processes, Consequences. Cambridge University Press, Cambridge. 666 p. ISBN 978-0-521-86480-0
- Keddy, P.A. 2010. Wetland Ecology: Principles and Conservation (2nd ed.), Cambridge University Press, Cambridge. 497 p. ISBN 978-0-521-51940-3
- Keeley, J.E.; Keeley, M.B.; Fotheringham, C. J. (2005). "Alien plant dynamics following fire in Mediterranean-climate California shrublands". Ecological Applications. 15 (6): 2109–2125. Bibcode:2005EcoAp..15.2109K. doi:10.1890/04-1222.
- Keeley, J.E.; Fotheringham, C.J.; Morais, M. (1999). "Reexamining fire suppression impacts on brushland fire regimes". Science. 284 (5421): 1829–1832. Bibcode:1999Sci...284.1829K. doi:10.1126/science.284.5421.1829. PMID 10364554.
- Keeley J.E., Bond W.J., Bradstock R.A., Pausas J.G. & Rundel P.W. (2012). Fire in Mediterranean Ecosystems: Ecology, Evolution and Management. Cambridge University Press. Link
- Knox, K.J.E.; Clarke, P. (2005). "Nutrient availability induces contrasting allocation and starch formation in resprouting and obligate seeding shrubs". Functional Ecology. 19 (4): 690–698. Bibcode:2005FuEco..19..690K. doi:10.1111/j.1365-2435.2005.01006.x.
- Kramp, B.A., D.R. Patton, and W.W. Brady. 1986. Run wild: wildlife/habitat relationships. U.S. Forest Service, Southwestern Region.
- MacDougall, A.S.; Beckwith, B.R.; Maslovat, C.Y. (2004). "Defining conservation strategies with historical perspectives: a case study from a degraded oak grassland ecosystem". Conservation Biology. 18 (2): 455–465. Bibcode:2004ConBi..18..455M. doi:10.1111/j.1523-1739.2004.00483.x. S2CID 86686044.
- McCullough, D.G.; Werner, R.A.; Neumann, D. (1998). "Fire and insects in northern and boreal forest ecosystems of North America". Annual Review of Entomology. 43: 107–127. doi:10.1146/annurev.ento.43.1.107. PMID 15012386. S2CID 37986234.
- Minnich, R.A. (1983). "Fire mosaics in Southern California and Northern Baja California". Science. 219 (4590): 1287–1294. Bibcode:1983Sci...219.1287M. doi:10.1126/science.219.4590.1287. PMID 17735593. S2CID 46485059.
- Pausas, J.G.; Keeley, J. E. (2009). "A Burning Story: The role of fire in the history of life". BioScience. 59 (7): 593–601. Bibcode:2009BiSci..59..593P. doi:10.1525/bio.2009.59.7.10. hdl:10261/57324. S2CID 43217453.
- Pausas, Juli G. (2012). Incendios forestales [Forest fires]. ¿Qué sabemos de? (in Spanish). Madrid: CSIC.
- Pyne, S.J. "How Plants Use Fire (And Are Used By It)." 2002. PBS NOVA Online. 1 January 2006. https://www.pbs.org/wgbh/nova/fire/plants.html.
- Savage, M.; Mast, J.N. (2005). "How resilient are southwestern ponderosa pine forests after crown fires?". Canadian Journal of Forest Research. 35 (4): 967–977. Bibcode:2005CaJFR..35..967S. doi:10.1139/x05-028. S2CID 85344798.
- Allan Savory; Jody Butterfield (2016). "Holistic Management", (3rd ed.) A Commonsense Revolution to Restore Our Environment. Island Press. ISBN 978-1-61091-743-8.
- Stephens, S. L.; Moghaddas, J. J. (2005). "Fuel treatment effects on snags and coarse woody debris in a Sierra Nevada mixed conifer forest". Forest Ecology and Management. 214 (1–3): 53–64. Bibcode:2005ForEM.214...53S. doi:10.1016/j.foreco.2005.03.055.
- United States Department of Fish and Agriculture (USDA) Forest Service. www.fs.fed.us.

Federal Wildland Fire Management Policy and Program Review (FWFMP).
http://www.fs.fed.us/land/wdfire.htm.

- United States National Park Service (USNPS). www.nps.gov.

Sequoia and King's Canyon National Parks. 13 February 2006. "Giant Sequoias and Fire."

- Vitt, D.H., L.A. Halsey and B.J. Nicholson. 2005. The Mackenzie River basin. pp. 166–202 in L.H. Fraser and P.A. Keddy (eds.). The World's Largest Wetlands: Ecology and Conservation. Cambridge University Press, Cambridge. 488 p.
- Whitlock, C., Higuera, P. E., McWethy, D. B., & Briles, C. E. 2010. "Paleoecological perspectives on fire ecology: revisiting the fire-regime concept". Open Ecology Journal 3: 6–23.
- Wisheu, I.C., M.L. Rosenzweig, L. Olsvig-Whittaker, A. Shmida. 2000. "What makes nutrient-poor Mediterranean heathlands so rich in plant diversity?" Evolutionary Ecology Research 2: 935–955.
