= The Last Movie Star =

2017 film by Adam Rifkin

- Theatrical release poster
- Directed by: Adam Rifkin
- Written by: Adam Rifkin
- Produced by: Brian Cavallaro; Neil Mandt; Adam Rifkin; Gordon Whitener
- Starring: Burt Reynolds; Ariel Winter; Clark Duke; Ellar Coltrane; Chevy Chase
- Cinematography: Scott Winig
- Edited by: Dan Flesher
- Music by: Austin Wintory
- Production companies: Whitener Entertainment Group; Mandt Bros. Productions
- Distributed by: A24
- Release dates: April 22, 2017 (Tribeca Film Festival); March 30, 2018 (United States)
- Running time: 103 minutes
- Country: United States
- Language: English
- Box office: $14,410

The Last Movie Star is a 2017 American comedy-drama film written and directed by Adam Rifkin, and starring Burt Reynolds, Ariel Winter, Clark Duke, Ellar Coltrane and Chevy Chase.

The film premiered at the Tribeca Film Festival on April 22, 2017. It was released through DirecTV Cinema on February 22, 2018, before being released in a limited release and through video on demand on March 30, 2018 by A24.

== Plot ==
An aging movie star is invited to a small, local film festival in Nashville. He attends and goes on a journey throughout his past as he faces the fact that his glory days are behind him.

The story begins with Vic Edwards, old, frail, and frustrated trying to perform everyday tasks. Although once a top movie star, he is ignored by an attractive woman while shopping. He has lunch with his friend Sonny and mentions he has been invited to get a lifetime achievement award at a film festival in Tennessee. Sonny tells him that this film festival has a great reputation, Clint Eastwood was a recent recipient, and encourages him to go. Thinking it might improve his mood, Vic agrees, but is unpleasantly surprised at the airport that his seat is coach rather than first class. Arriving at the airport, he is met by Lil, his assigned personal assistant and driver, who is not only unfamiliar with him but has not bothered to clean the trash out of the back seat of her dilapidated car.

Vic's irritation is increased when she takes him to a low-budget motel, not the high-class hotel he was expecting. He states that no way did Clint Eastwood stay there. Lil then takes him to the film festival which is run by her brother Doug. There Vic discovers it is not the prestigious film festival that Sonny had mentioned, but a shoe-string festival where the films are shown in the back room of a bar. Vic begins drinking heavily, and although the 30 to 40 people attending are in awe of him, he replies to their questions with contempt, and shortly walks out.

The next day when Lil arrives at the motel to drive him to the festival, Vic insists on being driven to his hometown, several hours away in Knoxville, Tennessee. They visit his boyhood home and the football stadium where he played college football. He explains that he started six games as a sophomore during their undefeated season. In the last game, with time running out and his team losing, he scored the winning touchdown but was injured and never able to play again. He has no respect for acting but says that being a football player is admirable, which only adds to his bitterness.

Vic tells Lil that while he was there he fell in love and married his first wife. He dumped her once he started becoming famous. Looking back, he sees that, out of all his wives, she was the only one that loved him for who he was, not just because he was a movie star. They go to a luxury hotel where he is recognized and given a suite. While there, Lil finds out her boyfriend is cheating on her from his social media posts. She wants to confront him, but Vic tells her that if the boyfriend treats her poorly, he is not worth the trouble and Vic knows from personal experience. They also go to the nursing home where his first wife lives but they find she has dementia and does not recognize him.

Vic thinks back on his career and imagines himself in his old movies interacting with the characters he played. First in a scene from Smokey and the Bandit and then Deliverance. Thinking of the women he treated badly, Vic decides to see his first wife again. The next morning, they take her from the nursing home to the riverside where Vic apologizes and re-enacts his marriage proposal. She is happy and they kiss. Vic and Lil return to the festival just as the last movie is playing (with scenes from an episode of Gunsmoke). Now more at peace, Vic accepts the award and their praise.

== Cast ==
- Burt Reynolds as Vic Edwards
- Ariel Winter as Lil McDougal
- Clark Duke as Doug McDougal
- Ellar Coltrane as Shane McAvoy
- Chevy Chase as Sonny
- Nikki Blonsky as Faith Cole
- Kathleen Nolan as Claudia Schulman
- Al-Jaleel Knox as Stuart Muckler
- Juston Street as Bjorn
- Shelley Waggener as Nurse
- C. Todd Vittum as Buddy Blump
- Amy Hoerler as Nurse Amy
- Cody Longo as Tad
- Jena Sims as Beautiful Woman #1
- Kennedy Summers as Beautiful Woman #2

== Production ==
Director Adam Rifkin said it took him about seven years to secure financing for the film. He wrote the film with Burt Reynolds in mind for the lead role, with many elements of the main character sharing similarities to Reynolds's personal life. Principal photography began on May 9, 2016. Most of the film was shot in Knoxville, Tennessee.

Scenes from previous Reynolds films Deliverance (1972) and Smokey and the Bandit (1977) were included in the film, with 2016-Reynolds inserted.

== Release ==
The film premiered under the working title Dog Years at the Tribeca Film Festival on April 22, 2017. On June 14, 2017, A24 and DirecTV Cinema acquired distribution rights to the film. Shortly thereafter, the film's title was changed from Dog Years to The Last Movie Star in a mutual decision between the filmmakers and A24 (who made the suggestion). The film served as the closing-night film at the Palm Springs International Film Festival on January 14, 2018. It was released on February 22, 2018, through DirecTV Cinema before being released in a limited release and through video on demand on March 30, 2018. A red carpet premiere at the Tennessee Theatre in Knoxville happened a day earlier, on March 29.

== Reception ==
=== Critical response ===
The Last Movie Star received mostly mixed reviews. On Rotten Tomatoes, the film holds an approval rating of 61% based on 28 reviews, with an average rating of 6.1/10. The website's critics consensus reads, "The Last Movie Star has a few poignant moments thanks to Burt Reynolds and Ariel Winter, but their performances are stranded in a middling drama unworthy of their efforts." On Metacritic, which assigns a weighted average rating to reviews, the film has a score of 46 out of 100, based on 11 critics, indicating "mixed or average reviews".

In a mixed review for NPR, Scott Tobias stated "Though Rifkin's heart is in the right place, there's not a moment in the film that isn't overplayed" and that, "Had Rifkin been willing to dial down the soppiness even a little, there's potential for The Last Movie Star to double as a tribute to Reynolds and a cautionary tale on the perils of fame." A review in Variety states that the movie "never quite transcends such pedestrian execution." Rolling Stone gave the film two out of four stars, calling it an "opportunity missed." In a positive review for RogerEbert.com, Sheila O'Malley gave the film three out of four stars.

Many reviews pointed to Reynolds's performance as a highlight of the film. Referring to Reynolds's performance, a review in the Los Angeles Times stated, "Thanks to its star’s all-in commitment, the overtly maudlin film works better than it should," while a review from Nerd Reactor stated "The Last Movie Star shows us why Burt Reynolds is a legendary actor. It’s just a shame that the rest of the film isn’t as good." Rolling Stone referred to the film as Reynolds's "swan song". The Last Movie Star was one of Reynolds's latter film projects, and he died several months after the film's release.

=== Accolades ===
The film, titled as Dog Years, received the Chairman's Award at the 2017 San Diego International Film Festival. It was also named Best International Dramatic Feature at the 2018 Edmonton International Film Festival.
