= C. albicans =

C. albicans may refer to:

- Candida albicans, a yeast-like fungus species
- Casearia albicans, a plant species endemic to Malaysia

== See also ==
- Albicans (disambiguation)
