= Hot-melt adhesive =

Form of thermoplastic adhesive

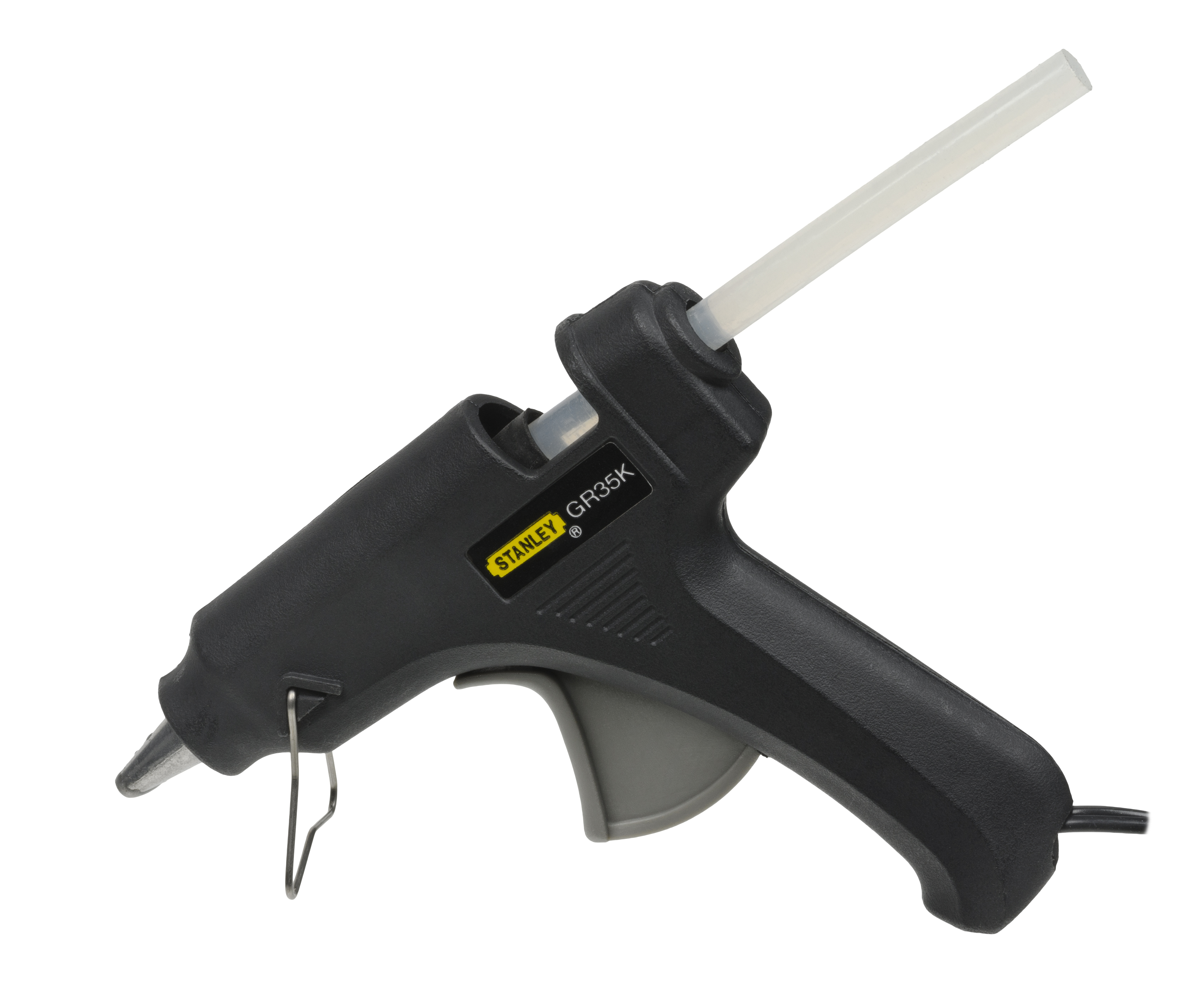
A hot glue gun loaded with a glue stick

Hot-melt adhesive (HMA), also known as hot glue, is a form of thermoplastic adhesive that is commonly sold as solid cylindrical sticks of various diameters designed to be applied using a hot glue gun. The gun uses a continuous-duty heating element to melt the plastic glue, which the user pushes through the gun either with a mechanical trigger mechanism on the gun, or with direct finger pressure. The glue squeezed out of the heated nozzle is initially hot enough to burn and even blister skin. The glue is sticky when hot, and solidifies in a few seconds to one minute. Hot-melt adhesives can also be applied by dipping or spraying, and are popular with hobbyists and crafters both for affixing and as an inexpensive alternative to resin casting.

In industrial use, hot-melt adhesives provide several advantages over solvent-based adhesives. Volatile organic compounds are reduced or eliminated, and the drying or curing step is eliminated. Hot-melt adhesives have a long shelf life and usually can be disposed of without special precautions. Some of the disadvantages involve thermal load of the substrate, limiting use to substrates not sensitive to higher temperatures, and loss of bond strength at higher temperatures, up to complete melting of the adhesive. Loss of bond strength can be reduced by using a reactive adhesive that after solidifying undergoes further curing, whether by moisture (e.g., reactive urethanes and silicones), or ultraviolet radiation.

Some HMAs are more resistant to chemical attack and weathering than others; specifically, low-cost HMAs, such as those typically used in craft-oriented glue guns, possess less resistance to weathering and to certain chemicals than high-performance, specialized HMA formulations, which are engineered for demanding environments.

HMAs do not lose thickness during solidifying, whereas solvent-based adhesives may lose up to 50–70% of layer thickness during drying.

== Properties ==
Melt viscosity
One of the most noticeable properties. Influences the spread of applied adhesive, and the wetting of the surfaces. Temperature-dependent, higher temperature lowers viscosity.
Melt flow index
A value roughly inversely proportional to the molecular weight of the base polymer. High melt flow index adhesives are easy to apply but have poor mechanical properties due to shorter polymer chains. Low melt flow index adhesives have better properties but are more difficult to apply.
Pot life stability
The degree of stability in molten state, the tendency to decompose and char. Important for industrial processing where the adhesive is molten for prolonged periods before deposition.
Bond-formation temperature
Minimum temperature below which sufficient wetting of substrates does not occur.

== General terms ==
Open time
The working time to make a bond, where the surface still retains sufficient tack, can range from seconds for fast-setting HMAs to infinity for pressure-sensitive adhesives.
Set time
Time to form a bond of acceptable strength.
Tack
The degree of surface stickiness of the adhesive; influences the strength of the bond between wetted surfaces.
Surface energy
Influences wetting of different kind of surfaces.

== Materials used ==
Hot-melt glues usually consist of one base material with various additives. The composition is usually formulated to have a glass transition temperature (onset of brittleness) below the lowest service temperature and a suitably high melt temperature as well. The degree of crystallization should be as high as possible but within limits of allowed shrinkage. The melt viscosity and the crystallization rate (and corresponding open time) can be tailored for the application. Faster crystallization rate usually implies higher bond strength. To reach the properties of semicrystalline polymers, amorphous polymers would require molecular weights too high and, therefore, unreasonably high melt viscosity; the use of amorphous polymers in hot-melt adhesives is usually only as modifiers. Some polymers can form hydrogen bonds between their chains, forming pseudo-cross-links which strengthen the polymer.

The natures of the polymer and the additives used to increase tackiness (called tackifiers) influence the nature of mutual molecular interaction and interaction with the substrate. In one common system, EVA is used as the main polymer, with terpene-phenol resin (TPR) as the tackifier. The two components display acid-base interactions between the carbonyl groups of vinyl acetate and hydroxyl groups of TPR, complexes are formed between phenolic rings of TPR and hydroxyl groups on the surface of aluminium substrates, and interactions between carbonyl groups and silanol groups on surfaces of glass substrates are formed. Polar groups, hydroxyls and amine groups can form acid-base and hydrogen bonds with polar groups on substrates like paper or wood or natural fibers. Nonpolar polyolefin chains interact well with nonpolar substrates. Good wetting of the substrate is essential for forming a satisfying bond between the adhesive and the substrate. More polar compositions tend to have better adhesion due to their higher surface energy. Amorphous adhesives deform easily, tending to dissipate most of mechanical strain within their structure, passing only small loads on the adhesive-substrate interface; even a relatively weak nonpolar-nonpolar surface interaction can form a fairly strong bond prone primarily to a cohesive failure. The distribution of molecular weights and degree of crystallinity influences the width of melting temperature range. Polymers with crystalline nature tend to be more rigid and have higher cohesive strength than the corresponding amorphous ones, but also transfer more strain to the adhesive-substrate interface. Higher molecular weight of the polymer chains provides higher tensile strength and heat resistance. Presence of unsaturated bonds makes the adhesive more susceptible to autoxidation and UV degradation and necessitates use of antioxidants and stabilizers.

The adhesives are usually clear or translucent, colorless, straw-colored, tan, or amber. Pigmented versions are also made and even versions with glittery sparkles. Materials containing polar groups, aromatic systems, and double and triple bonds tend to appear darker than non-polar fully saturated substances; when a water-clear appearance is desired, suitable polymers and additives, e.g. hydrogenated tackifying resins, have to be used.

Increase of bond strength and service temperature can be achieved by formation of cross-links in the polymer after solidification. This can be achieved by using polymers undergoing curing with residual moisture (e.g., reactive polyurethanes, silicones), exposure to ultraviolet radiation, electron irradiation, or by other methods.

Resistance to water and solvents is critical in some applications. For example, in textile industry, resistance to dry cleaning solvents may be required. Permeability to gases and water vapor may or may not be desirable. Non-toxicity of both the base materials and additives and absence of odors is important for food packaging.

Mass-consumption disposable products such as diapers necessitate development of biodegradable HMAs. Research is being performed on e.g., lactic acid polyesters, polycaprolactone with soy protein, etc.

Some of the possible base materials of hot-melt adhesives include the following:

- Ethylene-vinyl acetate (EVA) copolymers, low-performance, the low-cost and most common material for the glue sticks (e.g., the light amber colored Thermogrip GS51, GS52, and GS53). They provide sufficient strength between 30 °C (86 °F) and 50 °C (122 °F) but are limited to use below 60 °C (140 °F) to 80 °C (176 °F) and have low creep resistance under load. Typical melting point is about 130 °C (266 °F). The vinyl acetate monomer content is about 18–29 percent by weight of the polymer. High amounts of tackifiers and waxes are often used; an example composition is 30–40% of EVA copolymer (provides strength and toughness), 30–40% of tackifier resin (improves wetting and tack), 20–30% of wax (usually paraffin-based; reduces viscosity, alters setting speed, reduces cost), and 0.5–1.0% of stabilizers. Fillers can be added for special applications. Can be formulated for service temperatures ranging from −40 °C (−40 °F) to 80 °C (176 °F), and for both short and long open times and a wide range of melt viscosities. High stability at elevated temperatures and resistance to ultraviolet radiation, which can be further enhanced with suitable stabilizers. High vinylacetate content can serve for formulating a hot-melt pressure-sensitive adhesive (HMPSA). EVA formulations are compatible with paraffin. EVA was the base for the original hot melt composition. The composition of the copolymer influences its properties; increased content of ethylene promotes adhesion to nonpolar substrates such as polyethylene, while increased content of vinyl acetate promotes adhesion to polar substrates such as paper. Higher ethylene content also increases mechanical strength, block resistance, and paraffin solubility. Higher vinyl acetate content provides higher flexibility, adhesion, hot tack, and better low-temperature performance. Adhesive grade EVA usually contains 14–35% vinyl acetate. Lower molecular weight chains provide lower melt viscosity, better wetting, and better adhesion to porous surfaces. Higher molecular weights provide better cohesion at elevated temperatures and better low-temperature behavior. Increased ratio of vinyl acetate lowers the crystallinity of the material, improves optical clarity, flexibility and toughness, and worsens resistance to solvents. EVA can be crosslinked by, e.g., peroxides, yielding a thermosetting material. EVAs can be compounded with aromatic hydrocarbon resins. Grafting butadiene to EVA improves its adhesion. Its dielectric properties are poor due to high content of polar groups, the dielectric loss is moderately high. Polypropylene HMAs are a better choice for high-frequency electronics. EVAs are optically clearer and more gas and vapor permeable than polyolefins. Nearly half of EVA HMAs is used in packaging applications. Cryogenic grinding of EVAs can provide small, water-dispersible particles for heat-seal applications. EVA can degrade primarily by loss of acetic acid and formation of a double bond in the chain, and by oxidative degradation. EVA can be compounded into a wide range of HMAs, from soft pressure-sensitive adhesives to rigid structural adhesives for furniture construction.
  - Ethylene-acrylate copolymers have lower glass transition temperature and higher adhesion even to difficult substrates than EVA. Better thermal resistance, increased adhesion to metals and glass. Suitable for low temperature use. Ethylene-vinylacetate-maleic anhydride and ethylene-acrylate-maleic anhydride terpolymers offer very high performance. Examples are ethylene n-butyl acrylate (EnBA), ethylene-acrylic acid (EAA) and ethylene-ethyl acetate (EEA).
- Polyolefins (PO) (polyethylene (usually LDPE but also HDPE, which has a higher melting point and better temperature resistance), atactic polypropylene (PP or APP), polybutene-1, oxidized polyethylene, etc.), low-performance, for difficult-to-bond plastics. Very good adhesion to polypropylene, good moisture barrier, chemical resistance against polar solvents and solutions of acids, bases, and alcohols. Longer open time in comparison with EVA and polyamides. Polyolefins have low surface energy and provide good wetting of most metals and polymers. Metallocene-catalyst-synthesised polyolefins have a narrow distribution of molecular weight and correspondingly narrow melting temperature range. Due to the relatively high crystallinity, polyethylene-based glues tend to be opaque and, depending on additives, white or yellowish. Polyethylene hot melts have high pot life stability, are not prone to charring, and are suitable for moderate temperature ranges and on porous non-flexible substrates. Nitrogen or carbon dioxide can be introduced into the melt, forming a foam which increases spreading and open time and decreases transfer of heat to the substrate, allowing use of more heat-sensitive substrates; polyethylene-based HMAs are usually used. Foamable HMAs are available on the market since 1981. Amorphous polypropylene HMAs have good dielectric properties, making them suitable for use at high frequencies. PE and APP are usually used on their own or with just a small amount of tackifiers (usually hydrocarbons) and waxes (usually paraffins or microcrystalline waxes, for lower cost, improved anti-blocking, and altered open time and softening temperature). The molecular weight of the polymer is usually lower. Lower molecular weights provide better low-temperature performance and higher flexibility, higher molecular weights increase the seal strength, hot tack, and melt viscosity.
  - Polybutene-1 and its copolymers are soft and flexible, tough, partially crystalline, and slowly crystallizing with long open times. The low temperature of recrystallization allows for stress release during formation of the bond. Good bonding to nonpolar surfaces, worse bonding to polar ones. Good for rubber substrates. Can be formulated as pressure-sensitive.
  - Amorphous polyolefin (APO/APAO) polymers are compatible with many solvents, tackifiers, waxes, and polymers; they find wide use in many adhesive applications. APO hot melts have good fuel and acid resistance, moderate heat resistance, are tacky, soft and flexible, have good adhesion and longer open times than crystalline polyolefins. APOs tend to have lower melt viscosity, better adhesion, longer open times and slow set times than comparable EVAs. Some APOs can be used alone, but often they are compounded with tackifiers, waxes, and plasticizers (e.g., mineral oil, poly-butene oil). Examples of APOs include amorphous (atactic) propylene (APP), amorphous propylene/ethylene (APE), amorphous propylene/butene (APB), amorphous propylene/hexene (APH), amorphous propylene/ethylene/butene. APP is harder than APE, which is harder than APB, which is harder than APH, in accordance with decreasing crystallinity. APOs show relatively low cohesion, the entangled polymer chains have fairly high degree of freedom of movement. Under mechanical load, most of the strain is dissipated by elongation and disentanglement of polymer chains, and only a small fraction reaches the adhesive-substrate interface. Cohesive failure is therefore a more common failure mode of APOs.
- Polyamides and polyesters, high-performance
  - Polyamides (PA), high-performance, for severe environments; high-temperature glues; typically applied at over 200 °C (392 °F), but can degrade and char during processing. In molten state can somewhat degrade by atmospheric oxygen. High application temperature. High range of service temperatures, generally showing adequate bonding from −40 °C (−40 °F) to 70 °C (158 °F). Some compositions allow operation to 185 °C (365 °F) if they do not have to carry load. Resistant to plasticizers, therefore suitable for gluing polyvinyl chloride; only polyamides derived from secondary diamines however provide a satisfying bond. Resistant to oils and gasoline. Good adhesion to many substrates such as metal, wood, vinyl, ABS, and treated polyethylene and polypropylene. Some formulations are UL-approved for electrical applications requiring reduced flammability. Three groups are employed, with low, intermediate, and high molecular weight; the low MW ones are low-temperature melting and easy to apply, but have lower tensile strength, lower tensile-shear strength, and lower elongation than the high-MW ones. The high-MW ones require sophisticated extruders and are used as high-performance structural adhesives. The presence of hydrogen bonds between the polymer chains gives polyamides a high strength at even low molecular weights, in comparison with other polymers. Hydrogen bonds also provide retention of most of the adhesive strength up almost to the melting point; however they also make the material more susceptible to permeation of moisture in comparison with polyesters. Can be formulated as soft and tacky or as hard and rigid. Niche applications, together with polyesters taking less than 10% of total volume of hot-melt adhesives market. Absorption of moisture may lead to foaming during application as water evaporates during melting, leaving voids in the adhesive layer which degrade mechanical strength. Polyamide HMAs are usually composed of a dimer acid with often two or more different diamines. The dimer acid usually presents 60–80% of the total polyamide mass, and provides amorphous nonpolar character. Linear aliphatic amines such as ethylene diamine and hexamethylene diamine, provide hardness and strength. Longer chain amines such as dimer amine, reduce the amount of hydrogen bonds per volume of material, resulting in lower stiffness. Polyether diamines provide good low-temperature flexibility. Piperazine and similar diamines also reduce the number of hydrogen bonds. Only polyamides based on piperazine and similar secondary amines form satisfactory bond with polyvinyl chloride; primary amines form stronger hydrogen bonds within the adhesive, secondary amines can act only as proton acceptors, do not form hydrogen bonds within the polyamide, and are therefore free to form weaker bonds with vinyl, probably with the hydrogen atom adjacent to the chlorine.
  - Polyesters, similar to the ones used for synthetic fibers. High application temperature. Synthesized from a diol and a dicarboxylic acid. The length of the diol chain has major influence to the material's properties; with increasing diol chain length the melting point increases, the crystallization rate increases, and the degree of crystallization decreases. Both the diol and acid influence the melting point. In comparison with similar polyamides, due to absence of hydrogen bonds, polyesters have lower strength and melting point, but are much more resistant to moisture, though still susceptible. In other parameters, and in applications where these factors do not play a role, polyesters and polyamides are very similar. Polyesters are often used for bonding fabrics. They can be used on their own, or blended with large amounts of additives. They are used where high tensile strength and high temperature resistance are needed. Most polyester hot-melt adhesives have a high degree of crystallinity. Niche applications, together with polyamides taking less than 10% of total volume of hot-melt adhesives market. Water-dispersible amorphous polymers, modified by addition of sodium sulfonate groups for dispersability, were however developed for repulpable adhesives. Polyesters are often highly crystalline, leading to narrow melting temperature range, which is advantageous for high-speed bonding.
- Polyurethanes
  - Thermoplastic polyurethane (TPU) offer good adhesion to different surfaces due to presence of polar groups. Their low glass transition temperature provides flexibility at low temperatures. They are highly elastic and soft, with wide possible crystallization and melting point ranges. Polyurethanes consist of long linear chains with flexible, soft segments (diisocyanate-coupled low-melting polyester or polyether chains) alternating with rigid segments (diurethane bridges resulting from diisocyanate reacting with a small-molecule glycol chain extender). The rigid segments form hydrogen bonds with rigid segments of other molecules. Higher ratio of soft to hard segments provides better flexibility, elongation, and low-temperature performance, but also lower hardness, modulus, and abrasion resistance. The bonding temperature is lower than with most other HMAs, only about 50 °C (122 °F) to 70 °C (158 °F), when the adhesive behaves as a soft rubber acting as a pressure-sensitive adhesive. The surface wetting in this amorphous state is good, and on cooling the polymer crystallizes, forming a strong flexible bond with high cohesion. Choice of a proper diisocyanate and polyol combination allows tailoring the polyurethane properties; they can be used on their own or blended with a plasticizer. Polyurethanes are compatible with most common plasticizers, and many resins.
  - Polyurethanes (PUR), or reactive urethanes, for high temperatures and high flexibility. New type of hot-melt thermosetting adhesives, introduced in early 1990s. Solidification can be rapid or extended in range of several minutes; secondary curing with atmospheric or substrate moisture then continues for several hours, forming cross-links in the polymer. Excellent resistance to solvents and chemicals. Low application temperature, suitable for heat-sensitive substrates. Heat-resistant after curing, with service temperatures generally from −30 °C (−22 °F) to 150 °C (302 °F). Ink-solvent resistant. Often used in bookbinding, automotive, aerospace, filter and plastic bag applications. Susceptible to UV degradation causing discoloring and degradation of mechanical properties, requires blending with UV stabilizers and antioxidants. Usually based on prepolymers made of polyols and methylene diphenyl diisocyanate (MDI) or other diisocyanate, with small amount of free isocyanate groups; these groups when subjected to moisture react and cross-link. The uncured solidified "green" strength tends to be low than non-reactive HMAs, mechanical strength develops with curing. Green strength can be improved by blending the prepolymer with other polymers.
    Although hot melt adhesives have been around for decades, advancements in PUR development have made it popular for applications like bookbinding, woodworking, and packaging starting in the 1950s. Since it is highly flexible and has a broad thermal setting range, PUR is perfect for bonding difficult substrates.
- Styrene block copolymers (SBC), also called styrene copolymer adhesives and rubber-based adhesives, have good low-temperature flexibility, high elongation, and high heat resistance. Frequently used in pressure-sensitive adhesive applications, where the composition retains tack even when solidified; however non-pressure-sensitive formulations are also used. High heat resistance, good low-temperature flexibility. Lower strength than polyesters. They usually have A-B-A structure, with an elastic rubber segment between two rigid plastic endblocks. High-strength film formers as standalone, increase cohesion and viscosity as an additive. Water-resistant, soluble in some organic solvents; cross-linking improves solvent resistance. Resins associating with endblocks (cumarone-indene, α-methyl styrene, vinyl toluene, aromatic hydrocarbons, etc.) improve adhesion and alter viscosity. Resins associating to the midblocks (aliphatic olefins, rosin esters, polyterpenes, terpene phenolics) improve adhesion, processing and pressure-sensitive properties. Addition of plasticizers reduces cost, improves pressure-sensitive tack, decrease melt viscosity, decrease hardness, and improve low-temperature flexibility. The A-B-A structure promotes a phase separation of the polymer, binding together the endblocks, with the central elastic parts acting as cross-links; SBCs do not require additional cross-linking.
  - Styrene-butadiene-styrene (SBS), used in high-strength PSA applications.
  - Styrene-isoprene-styrene (SIS), used in low-viscosity high-tack PSA applications.
  - Styrene-ethylene/butylene-styrene (SEBS), used in low self-adhering non-woven applications.
  - Styrene-ethylene/propylene (SEP)
- Polycaprolactone with soy protein, using coconut oil as plasticizer, a biodegradable hot-melt adhesive investigated at Korea University.
- Polycarbonates
- Fluoropolymers, with tackifiers and ethylene copolymer with polar groups
- Silicone rubbers, undergo cross-linking after solidification, form durable flexible UV and weather resistant silicone sealant
- Thermoplastic elastomers
- Polypyrrole (PPY), a conductive polymer, for intrinsically conducting hot-melt adhesives (ICHMAs), used for EMI shielding. EVA compounded with 0.1–0.5 wt.% PPY are strongly absorbing in near infrared, allowing use as near-infrared activated adhesives.
- various other copolymers

== Additives ==
The usual additives include the following:

- tackifying resins (e.g., rosins and their derivates, terpenes and modified terpenes, aliphatic, cycloaliphatic and aromatic resins (C5 aliphatic resins, C9 aromatic resins, and C5/C9 aliphatic/aromatic resins), hydrogenated hydrocarbon resins, and their mixtures, terpene-phenol resins (TPR, used often with EVAs)), up to about 40%. Tackifiers tend to have low molecular weight, and glass transition and softening temperature above room temperature, providing them with suitable viscoelastic properties. Tackifiers frequently present most of both weight percentage and cost of the hot-melt adhesive.
- waxes, e.g., microcrystalline waxes, fatty amide waxes or oxidized Fischer–Tropsch waxes; increase the setting rate. One of the key components of formulations, waxes lower the melt viscosity and can improve bond strength and temperature resistance.
- plasticizers (e.g., benzoates such as 1,4-cyclohexane dimethanol dibenzoate, glyceryl tribenzoate, or pentaerythritol tetrabenzoate, phthalates, paraffin oils, polyisobutylene, chlorinated paraffins, etc.)
- antioxidants and stabilizers (e.g., hindered phenols, BHT, phosphites, phosphates, hindered aromatic amines); added in small amounts (<1%), not influencing physical properties. These compounds protect the material from degradation both during service life, compounding and in molten state during application. Stabilizers based on functionalized silicones have improved resistance to extraction and outgassing.
- UV stabilizers protect the material against degradation by ultraviolet radiation
- pigments and dyes, glitter
- biocides for hindering bacterial growth
- flame retardants
- antistatic agents
- fillers, for reducing cost, adding bulk, improving cohesive strength (forming an aggregate-matrix composite material) and altering properties; e.g., calcium carbonate, barium sulfate, talc, silica, carbon black, clays (e.g., kaolin).

Fugitive glues and pressure-sensitive adhesives are available in hot-melt form. With a tack-like consistency, PSA are bonded through the application of pressure at room temperature.

Additives and polymers containing unsaturated bonds are highly prone to autoxidation. Examples include rosin-based additives. Antioxidants can be used for suppressing this aging mechanism.

Addition of ferromagnetic particles, hygroscopic water-retaining materials, or other materials can yield a hot-melt adhesive which can be activated by microwave heating.

Addition of electrically conductive particles can yield conductive hot-melt formulations.

== Applications ==
Hot-melt adhesives are as numerous as they are versatile. In general, hot melts are applied by extruding, rolling or spraying, and the high melt viscosity makes them ideal for porous and permeable substrates. HMA are capable of bonding an array of different substrates including: rubbers, ceramics, metals, plastics, glass and wood.

Today, HMA (hot-melt adhesives) are available in a variety of different types, allowing for use in a wide range of applications across several industries. For use with hobby or craft projects such as the assembly or repair of remote-control foam model aircraft, and artificial floral arrangements, hot-melt sticks and hot-melt glue guns are used in the application of the adhesive. For use in industrial processes, adhesive is supplied in larger sticks and glue guns with higher melting rates. Aside from hot-melt sticks, HMA can be delivered in other formats such as granular or power hot-melt blocks for bulk melt processors. Larger applications of HMA traditionally use pneumatic systems to supply adhesive.

Examples of industries where HMA is used includes:

- Closing the flaps of corrugated boxes and paperboard cartons in the packaging industry.
- Spine gluing in the bookbinding industry
- Profile-wrapping, product assembly and laminating applications in the woodworking industry
- Disposable diapers are constructed through the use of HMA, bonding the non-woven material to both the backsheet and the elastics.
- Many electronic device manufacturers may also use an HMA to affix parts and wires, or to secure, insulate, and protect the device's components.

== Format ==
Hot-melt adhesives are often sold in sticks or cartridges suited to the intended glue gun. Bulk pellets are also used: these are dumped or transported to an adhesive reservoir for subsequent application. Large open-head drums are also used for high volume application. Hot-melt drum pumps have a heated platen which melts the adhesive for pumping through heated hoses.
