= Post-fire hillslope stabilization treatments =

Treatments aimed at stabilizing fire-affected slopes

Post-fire hillslope stabilization treatments are treatments aimed at stabilizing fire-affected slopes by counteracting the negative impact of fire on vegetation and soil properties. The final objective of these treatments is reducing the risk of catastrophic runoff and erosion events and protecting valued resources downhill. Post-fire hillslope stabilization treatments are also called post-fire mitigation treatments and emergency stabilization treatments.

Vegetation fires usually partially or totally consume the canopy, above-ground organic residue (litter), fine roots, and soil organic compounds, reducing soil protection, enhancing soil water repellency, and compromising soil stability. The combined effect of fire and the occurrence of heavy rainfall in the post-fire season can lead to catastrophic hydrologic and erosion events with severe impacts on population and valued resources downhill such as housing, infrastructure, water supply systems, and critical habitats.

For example, high intensity rainfall after the Thomas Fire in California (USA) led to catastrophic floods and debris flows in 2018 with 20 people dead, 300 houses destroyed, and critical infrastructures severely affected. Stabilization treatments are part of the Burned Area Emergency Response (BAER) programme implemented by the US Forest Service and Department of Interior (USA) and similar programmes such as the Rapid Response Assessment Team (RRAT) in Australia conducted in many other fire-prone regions.

== Classification of post-fire hillslope stabilization treatments ==
The design of the hillslope stabilization treatments are aimed at:

- Counteracting the effect of fire on the soil protection provided by the vegetation and surface cover: treatments such as seeding and mulching are aimed at reducing runoff and erosion by providing protection to the soil surface. They mimick above ground organic layers that protect the soil against the raindrop impact and absorb rain water, decreasing runoff volume and velocity.
- Counteracting the effect of fire on specific soil properties involved in the runoff and erosion processes: treatments that seek for offsetting fire effects on soils such as enhanced soil water repellency (surfactants) or decreased soil aggregation (flocculants). These products can be applied alone or combined with other stabilization treatments to increase their effectiveness.
- Reducing slope length: treatments such as the erosion barriers are intended to reduce the amount of sediments that reach values-at-risk downhill by reducing the slope length and, thus, runoff velocity and erosion potential. They also create mini-dams that hold the runoff, promote infiltration, and sediments settling.

== Types, selection, and implementation of post-fire treatments ==
The selection of hillslope stabilization treatments should consider three key elements: (i) the effectiveness of the treatment, (iii) the cost of production and transport, and (i) the values-at-risk to be protected The most cost-effective treatment might not be adequate to protect critical values-at-risk whereas the treatment with the highest effectiveness and cost could not be suitable to treat large areas if the cost of repairing or replacing values-at-risk is low. Since the highest risk of catastrophic events happens during the first year after the fire, the implementation of any emergency treatment must be conducted quickly after the fire.

- Seeding: Seeds of native or non-native grasses (usually non-reproducing annuals to avoid negative interactions with native flora and alteration of local biodiversity) are manually or aerially applied over the burned area to promote a rapid vegetation establishment that provides ground cover and increase soil stability with their shallow root system. Seeding have been the post-fire hillslope mitigation treatment most frequently used in the world and mainly in the USA (in the 1970s and 1980s 75% of the burned areas treated in the USA were seeded). However, negative side-effects such as the potential introduction of non-native species, negative interactions with the recover of native vegetation, and its low efficiency during the first year after the fire before their germination contributed to the reduction of its use (in the 2000s only 30% of the burned areas treated in the USA were seeded).
- Erosion barriers: Contour-felled logs or straw wattles became popular in the USA during the 1990s coinciding with the decrease of seeded areas. Felled-logs or straw wattles are placed on the hillslope contour and aim to reduce runoff velocity and create areas where the runoff water can infiltrate, and the sediment settle. Recent studies, however, have shown the low effectiveness of this technique for high intensity rainfall, when the holding capacity is easily exceeded, or their holding capacity is reduced by sediments from previous erosion events. Additionally, a poor design and installation (gaps between the log and the soil surface or not on contour with a slope to one end) can lead to increased erosion due to the concentration of the runoff in lowest end of the barrier. Despite these recent insights, log barriers are still extensively applied in Mediterranean countries such as Spain.
- Mulching: Covering the soil surface with a material that provides protection against raindrop impact, retains water, and reduce runoff velocity. The material most commonly used is agricultural straw, whose application reached in the 2000s 18% of the burned areas treated in the USA. This extensive use is due to its high effectiveness but also the development of its aerial application that reduced the application costs and made it viable in inaccessible areas. An alternative to straw mulching is the wood-based mulch using wood chips, wood shreds, and wood strand but also pine needles and forest residues. Although marginally used before the 2010s, wood-based mulching is becoming popular since it prevents side-effects of agricultural straw such as the introduction of non-native species and invasive weeds, its longer longevity, and stability to wind. Additionally, wood-based mulches can be produced locally from burned or green trees, reducing transport costs.
- Chemical treatments: Tackifiers, fertilizers, and flocculants are used as stand-alone emergency treatments or in combination with other treatment to provide increased soil stability to reduce runoff and erosion. Anionic polyacrylamide (PAM), a synthetic petroleum by-product, is a flocculant that is applied as pellets or in solution to the soil surface in fire-affected areas. PAM binds soil particles, increase soil stability and infiltration, and reduce soil erosion. However, studies on their effectiveness in fire-affected areas are inconclusive or show no significant effect on runoff and erosion
- Combined treatments: Seeding has been frequently combined with fertilizers to increase the viability of the seedlings. Seeds have been coated with surfactant to reduce fire-induced soil water repellency and increase water availability. Organic fibres (wood shreds, paper, cotton and flax) have been mixed with seeds, fertilizers and tackifiers to produce hydromulches. Although combined treatments can have higher effectiveness, the associated increase in production or transport costs can make their application less cost-effective and only viable to provide additional protection to critical values-at-risk.
