= Whitten =

Whitten may refer to:

== Places ==
- Whitten, Iowa, United States
- Whitten Peak, Antarctica
- Jamie Whitten Lock and Dam, located on the Tennessee–Tombigbee Waterway in Tishomingo County, Mississippi
- Jamie L. Whitten Building, administration building of the U.S. Department of Agriculture

== Sports ==
- E. J. Whitten Legends Game, annual charity Australian rules football All-star game,
- E. J. Whitten Medal, awarded to the best Victorian player in an Australian rules football State of Origin football match
- Whitten Oval, stadium located in Melbourne, Victoria, Australia
- Whitten Soccer Complex, located at Belmont University, Nashville, Tennessee

== Other uses ==
- Charles A. Whitten Medal, recognizes outstanding achievement in research on the form and dynamics of the Earth and planets
- Whitten effect, in ethology

== See also ==
- Whiten (disambiguation)
