= Fugitive glue =

Type of adhesive intended for temporary fastening

Fugitive glue is a glue that contains a high amount of alcohol and is delivered to the substrate at a glue station when wet. The type of bond it produces is temporary in nature and is intended to hold two pieces of material together through the duration of folding and gluing operations. It will eventually evaporate without causing damage to either one of the separated substrates.

Fugitive glues are frequently used in marketing, where some object—product sample or a return envelope—is glued to another, usually paper, object—a mailing envelope or a magazine. They tend to perform best on smooth, non-porous surfaces. In these applications, fugitive glues are not resealable pressure-sensitive adhesives such as are used on pressure-sensitive tapes or post-it notes, although resealable formulations are available.
