= Albicans =

Albicans (Latin, 'whitening') may refer to:

- Corpus albicans, the regressed form of the corpus luteum in ovaries
- Species with binomial names including albicans: see

== See also ==
- Whitening (disambiguation)
