= Pressure-sensitive adhesive =

Type of non reactive adhesive

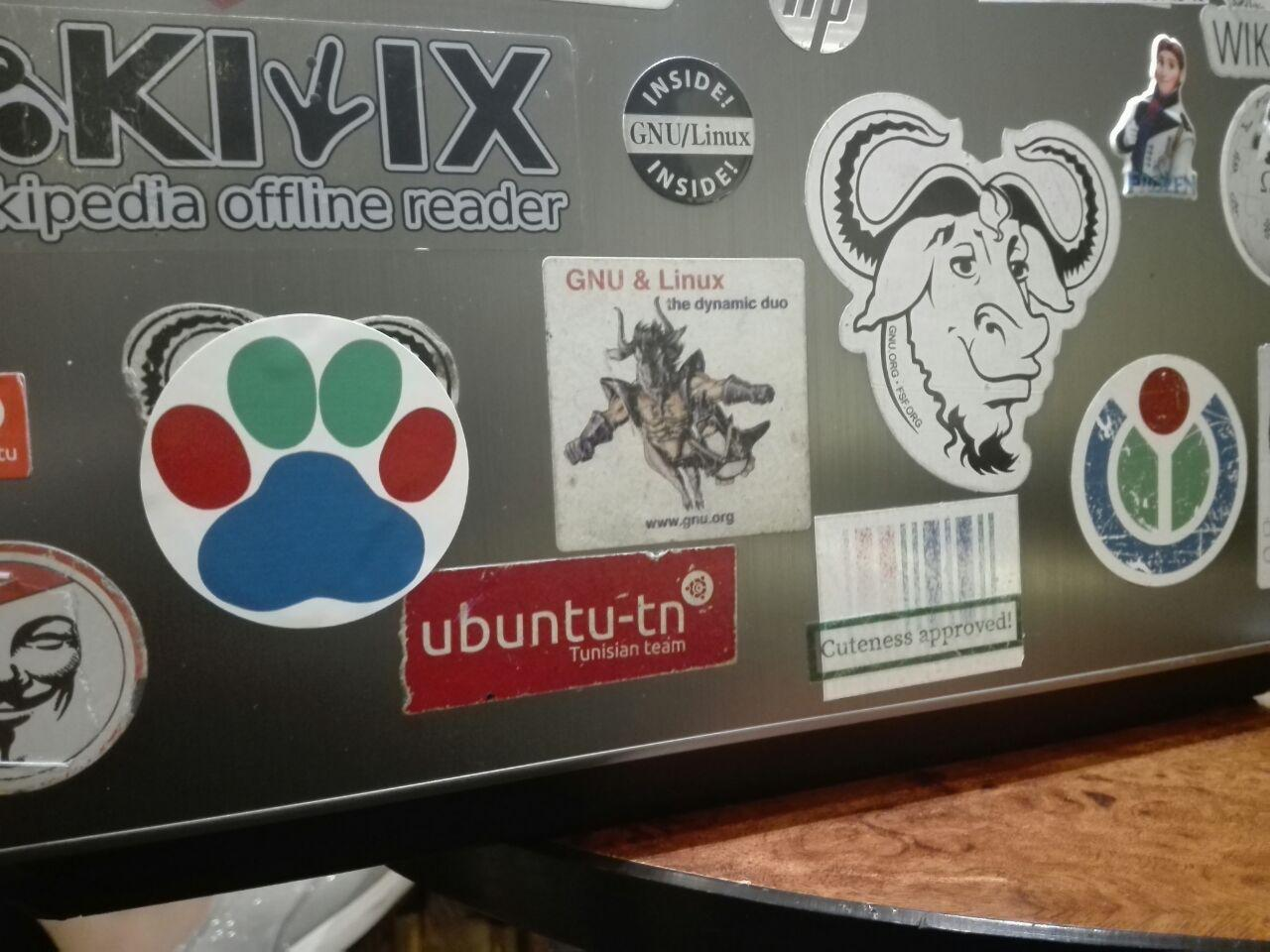
Stickers on a laptop, applied with pressure-sensitive adhesive

Pressure-sensitive adhesive (PSA, self-adhesive, self-stick adhesive) is a type of nonreactive adhesive which forms a bond when pressure is applied to a surface not requiring any solvents, water, or heat. It is used in pressure-sensitive tapes, labels, glue dots, stickers, sticky note pads, automobile trim, and a wide variety of other products.

As the name "pressure-sensitive" indicates, the degree of bond is influenced by the amount of pressure which is used to apply the adhesive to the surface.

Surface factors such as smoothness, surface energy, cleanliness, etc. also affect the resulting bond.

PSAs are usually designed to form a bond and hold properly at room temperatures. PSAs typically reduce or lose their tack at low temperatures and reduce their shear holding ability at high temperatures, though there are special adhesives made to function at high or low temperatures.

== Structural and pressure-sensitive adhesives ==
Adhesives may be broadly divided in two classes: structural and pressure-sensitive. To form a permanent bond, structural adhesives harden via processes such as evaporation of solvent (for example, white glue), reaction with UV radiation (as in dental adhesives), chemical reaction (such as two part epoxy), or cooling (as in hot melt). In contrast, pressure-sensitive adhesives (PSAs) form a bond simply by the application of light pressure to marry the adhesive with the adherend.

Pressure-sensitive adhesives are designed with a balance between flow and resistance to flow. The bond forms because the adhesive is soft enough to flow, or wet, the adherend. The bond has strength because the adhesive is hard enough to resist flow when stress is applied to the bond. Once the adhesive and the adherend are in proximity, there are also molecular interactions such as van der Waals forces involved in the bond, which contribute significantly to the ultimate bond strength. PSAs exhibit viscoelastic (viscous and elastic) properties, both of which are used for proper bonding.

In contrast with structural adhesives, whose strength is evaluated as lap shear strength, pressure-sensitive adhesives are characterized by their shear and peel resistance as well as their initial tack. These properties are dependent, among other things, on the formulation, coating thickness, rub-down and temperature.

"Permanent" pressure-sensitive adhesives are initially pressure-sensitive and removable (for example to recover mislabeled goods) but after hours or days change their properties, by becoming less or not viscous, or by increasing the bond strength, so that the bond becomes permanent.

=== Effects of shape ===
The adhesive bonding of a tape or label can be affected by its shape. Tapes with pointed corners start to detach at those corners; adhesive strength can be improved by rounding the corners.

== Applications ==
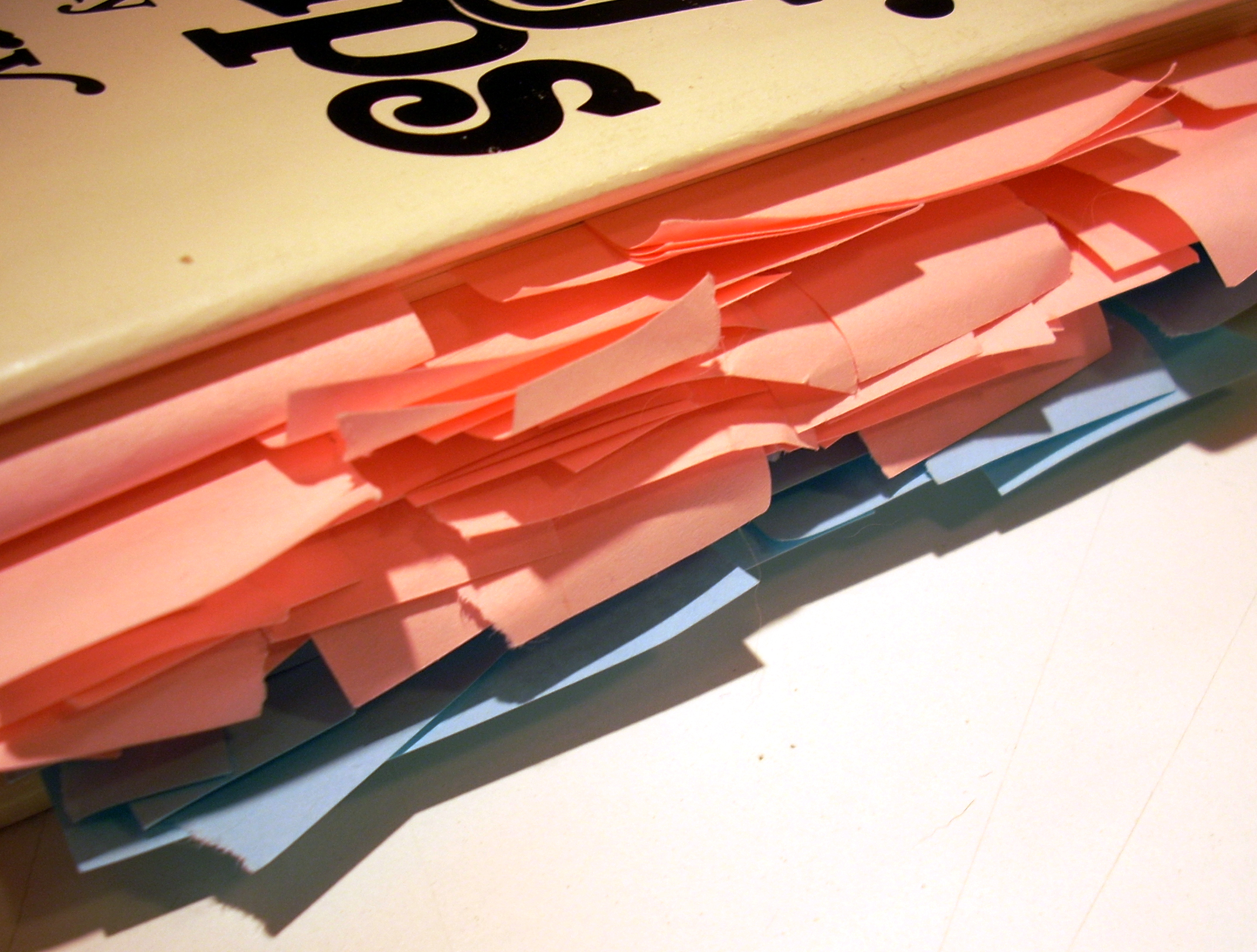
Post-it notes

Examples of permanent applications include safety labels for power equipment, foil tape for HVAC duct work, automotive interior trim assembly, and sound/vibration damping films. Some high performance permanent PSAs exhibit high adhesion values and can support kilograms of weight per square centimeter of contact area, even at elevated temperature. These build adhesion to a permanent bond after several hours or days.

=== Removal ===
Removable adhesives create a temporary bond and can often be taken off after months or years without leaving residue. They’re used in protective films, masking tapes, sticky notes and bookmarks, price labels, promotional materials, and skin-contact products like dressings, EKG electrodes, athletic tape, and transdermal patches. Some are made to stick and unstick repeatedly; they have low adhesion and can't support much weight.

Sometimes clean removal of pressure sensitive tape can be difficult without damaging the substrate that it is adhered to. Pulling it off slowly and at a low peel angle helps reduce damage. Adhesive residue can be softened with heat or certain organic solvents. Extreme cold (like dry ice or freeze spray) can turn viscoelastic materials glassy and is useful for removing many PSAs.

== Manufacture ==
Pressure-sensitive adhesives are manufactured with either a liquid carrier or in 100% solid form. Articles such as tapes and labels are made from liquid PSAs by coating the adhesive on a support and evaporating the organic solvent or water carrier, usually in a hot air dryer. The dry adhesive may be further heated to initiate a cross-linking reaction and increase molecular weight. 100% solid PSAs may be low viscosity polymers that are coated and then reacted with radiation to increase molecular weight and form the adhesive (radiation cured PSA); or they may be high-viscosity materials that are heated to reduce viscosity enough to allow coating, and then cooled to their final form (hot melt PSA, HMPSA).

== Composition ==
PSAs are usually based on an elastomer compounded with a suitable tackifier (e.g., a rosin ester). The elastomers can be based on acrylics, which can have sufficient tack on their own and do not require a tackifier.

Styrene block copolymers (SBC), also called styrene copolymer adhesives and rubber-based adhesives, have good low-temperature flexibility, high elongation, and high heat resistance. They are frequently used in hot melt adhesive applications, where the composition retains tack even when solidified; however non-pressure-sensitive formulations are also used. They usually have A-B-A structure, with an elastic rubber segment between two rigid plastic endblocks. High-strength film formers as standalone, increase cohesion and viscosity as an additive. Water-resistant, soluble in some organic solvents; cross-linking improves solvent resistance. Resins associating with endblocks (cumarone-indene, α-methyl styrene, vinyl toluene, aromatic hydrocarbons, etc.) improve adhesion and alter viscosity. Resins associating to the midblocks (aliphatic olefins, rosin esters, polyterpenes, terpene phenolics) improve adhesion, processing and pressure-sensitive properties. Addition of plasticizers reduces cost, improves pressure-sensitive tack, decrease melt viscosity, decrease hardness, and improves low-temperature flexibility. The A-B-A structure promotes a phase separation of the polymer, binding together the endblocks, with the central elastic parts acting as cross-links; SBCs do not require additional cross-linking.

Styrene-butadiene-styrene (SBS) is used in high-strength PSA applications, styrene-ethylene/butylene-styrene (SEBS) in low self-adhering non-woven applications, and styrene-ethylene/propylene (SEP) and styrene-isoprene-styrene (SIS) are used in low-viscosity high-tack PSA applications.

== Temperature considerations ==
The properties of pressure sensitive adhesives can be strongly affected by temperature. The tack or "quick stick" characteristics are critical for the initial bonding to the intended substrate; cool temperatures can make a PSA too firm, losing its tack. Once applied, temperature affects the performance on its intended use: Heat can soften an adhesive, reducing its shear holding ability. Cold temperatures can also contribute to premature release. Most PSA and tape test methods are conducted at 23 (°C) and 50% relative humidity but it is common to also conduct testing at other temperatures (and lighter rub-down pressures) to better match PSA performance with requirements of end users.

Adhesive formulators often use the more fundamental temperature characteristics using the advanced methods such as dynamic mechanical analysis and differential scanning calorimetry. Of particular importance is identifying the glass-transition temperature, "T"_{g}.

== See also ==
- Adhesive remover
- Blu-Tack
- Contact mechanics
- Dynamic mechanical analysis
- Glue dots
- Gaffer tape
- List of adhesive tapes
- Post-it note
- Rheology
- Self-adhesive stamp
- Viscoelasticity
- Pressure-sensitive paper
- Wetting – Ability of a liquid to maintain contact with a solid surface
