= Tackifier =

Type of adhesive chemical compound

Tackifiers are chemical compounds used in formulating adhesives to increase tack, the stickiness of the surface of the adhesive. They are usually low-molecular weight compounds with high glass transition temperature. At low strain rate, they provide higher stress compliance, and become stiffer at higher strain rates.

Tackifiers tend to have low molecular weight, and glass transition and softening temperature above room temperature, providing them with suitable viscoelastic properties. Tackifiers frequently represent most of both weight percentage and cost of hot melt adhesives and pressure-sensitive adhesives. In hot melt adhesives they can comprise up to about 40% of total mass.

Tackifiers are usually resins (e.g. rosins and their derivates, terpenes and modified terpenes, aliphatic, cycloaliphatic and aromatic resins (C5 aliphatic resins, C9 aromatic resins, and C5/C9 aliphatic/aromatic resins), hydrogenated hydrocarbon resins, and their mixtures, terpene-phenol resins (TPR, used often with ethylene-vinyl acetate adhesives)), novolacs.

Many pressure-sensitive adhesives are a blend of rubbers (natural or synthetic) and a tackifying resin. Some acrylic adhesives also include an additional tackifier. Silicone rubber–based pressure-sensitive adhesives require special tackifiers based on "MQ" silicate resins, composed of a monofunctional trimethyl silane ("M") reacted with quadrafunctional silicon tetrachloride ("Q").

Tackifiers are also used in tyres.
