= Stress-whitening =

Sign of stress on a material

Stress-whitening is where a white line appears along a bend or curve when a material is stressed by bending or punching operations.

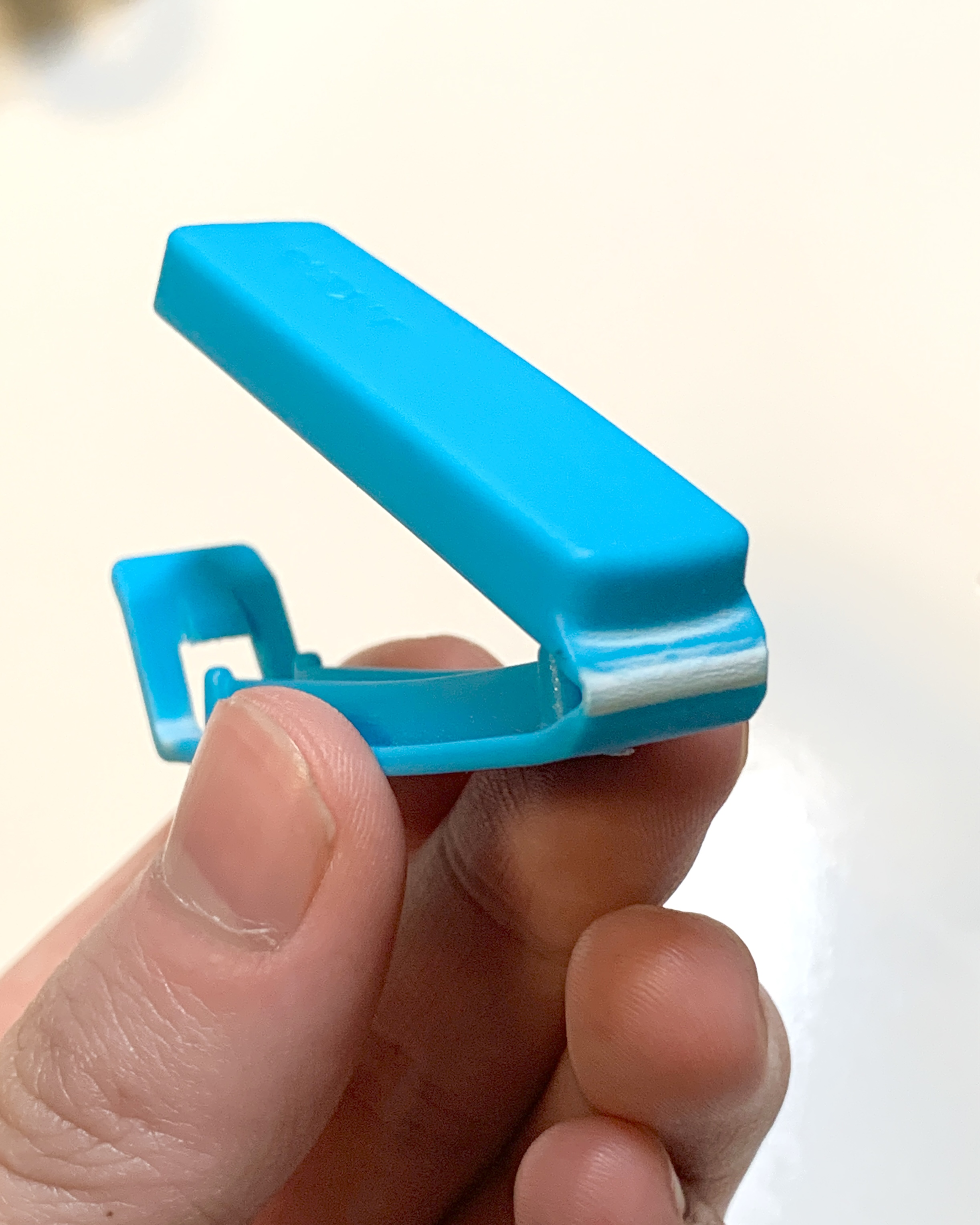
An example of stress whitening on this package wrapper clip

The appearance of white line indicates that there is an onset of failure of the corresponding material. This phenomenon is known as "stress-whitening". This is more common in amorphous materials, and also in some brittle polymers like PS, PMMA and polycarbonate. The white colour is because of the light scattering by the crazes and changes in the refractive index of the area under stress.
