= Gordon Whitener =

Gordon D. Whitener
- Born: c. 1965 (age 60–61); Chattanooga, Tennessee, United States
- Education: University of Tennessee
- Occupation: Businessman
- Known for: President and CEO of The Whitener Company, involvement in sports, media, and entertainment ventures
- Spouse: Susie Whitener
- Website: thewhitenercompany.com

Gordon D. Whitener is an American businessman who is the founder, chairman, and chief executive officer of The Whitener Company, a Tennessee-based consulting and investment firm involved in sports, media, and entertainment. He also serves as the chairman of several of the firm's portfolio companies.

== Early life and education ==
A native of Dalton, Georgia, Whitener attended Dalton High School. He went on to attend The University of Tennessee, where he worked under Johnny Majors and staff for the Tennessee Volunteers football team and earned a Bachelor of Arts in Political Science in 1985. Later in life, Whitener completed The Executive Program within the Kenan-Flagler Business School at The University of North Carolina at Chapel Hill.

== Coaching career ==
Whitener's first job was working as a graduate offensive assistant for the Oklahoma State University football team under head coach Pat Jones and staff. At the age of 23, he was promoted to recruiting coordinator for the Cowboys. During his time directing Oklahoma State's recruiting efforts, the team secured future Heisman Trophy winner Barry Sanders and current OSU Head Coach Mike Gundy, among others.

== Business career ==
In 1988, Whitener made the decision to leave college football and began a career in sales and marketing at Collins & Aikman Floor Coverings (now Tandus) in the Dallas area. During his first year with the company, Whitener had a very successful sales career, and within a short time, advanced to Vice President of marketing for the company. In 1993, Whitener was offered an executive position with Interface, Inc., a giant and competitor in the floorcoverings industry. He quickly advanced to become president and chief executive officer of Interface Americas, Interface's largest division, that included three commercial carpet manufacturers and a group of distribution and services companies that supported the manufacturers. Under Whitener's leadership, the company experienced record sales and profit growth. Additionally, Whitener served as a Senior Vice President and on the board of directors for Interface, Inc.

In 1999, Whitener launched the US Cowboy Tour, a rodeo and sports marketing company that specialized in bringing rodeo events to the Southeastern United States. US Cowboy worked with the PRCA on their television package and ran the Xtreme Bulls Tour. Today, it manages The Wrangler Network. In October 2002, Whitener was brought on as COO of Host Communications (now IMG College), one of the nation's leading providers of affinity, multimedia, promotional, and event management services to universities, athletic conferences, associations, and corporations. Shortly thereafter, he was named president and chief executive officer of Host, where he served until 2007. In 2007, Whitener became chairman and chief executive officer of SportsMyx Holdings, LLC, which owned Action Sports Media until late 2009.

=== The Whitener Company ===
In 2010, Whitener formed The Whitener Company, which provides consulting services in the areas of marketing technology, event production and management, sponsorship sales and business portfolio management and acceleration.

In 2015, Whitener launched Mandt Media. In 2015, Whitener Entertainment Group was created in an effort to promote the film industry within the state of Tennessee. In 2016, WEG produced "The Last Movie Star", starring Burt Reynolds and Ariel Winter. The film was directed by Adam Rifkin and shot exclusively in the state of Tennessee.

In 2017, the group, alongside California-based Moorad Sports Partners, became a part of Charleston Tennis, LLC, which owns and operates Family Circle Tennis Center on Daniel Island in Charleston, South Carolina. In 2018, The Whitener Company partnered with Chronicle Collectibles to launch Silver Screen Bottling Company: a licensing, bottling, and distribution company for the most prized properties in film, television, gaming, music, and sports. Under license by CBS Consumer Products, Bethesda Softworks, and ZeniMax Media, Silver Screen Bottling Company has launched spirit brands around iconic fan-centric franchises like Star Trek and the Fallout video game series.

The Whitener Company operates around the world and has offices or portfolio companies in Knoxville, Hollywood, Dallas, Chicago, New York City, Charlotte, and Atlanta.

== Other business ==
Whitener serves as a Member of the Advisory Board at Game Theory Group International, LLC. He served as a Member of the Strategic Advisory Board of ROBO Global, LLC. He served as Director of Aviation Group, Inc. He served as Director of Bull Run Corporation. He was also chairman of Winnercomm, Inc.

== Recognition ==
- Member, Producers Guild of America (PGA)
- Inductee, Kentucky Colonel in the 212th year of the Commonwealth
- Recipient, Titan Award (http://www.iida.org/content.cfm/titan-award), an award that recognizes outstanding service to the Interior Design profession by a design-related individual, company or organization, special services recognition by the International Interior Design Association, June 1996
- Inductee, GeorgiaTrend “40 Under 40” Rising Stars in Georgia Business and Politics”, 1998
- Inductee, National Cowboy & Western Heritage Museum Board of Directors, April 2014 to current
- Recipient, Outstanding Achievement: Technology-Feature/Segment “Virtual Reality: The Changing Face of Video”, 2016-2017 Emmy Award
- Recipient, Commendation from the Governor of Georgia, Roy E. Barnes, for the study on the Governor's Education Study Commission, November 2000
- Member, the President's OKC Scholarship Fund Advisory Board, April 1996
- Member, The Young Presidents Organization (YPO)
- Member, Business Executives for National Security (BENS)
- Founder, The Dalton Plan: commended by the United States Congress
