= Whiting =

Whiting is the name of

- powdered and washed white chalk (calcium carbonate)

== Fish ==
- Merlangius merlangus, the original fish species to receive the name; a common food fish of the cod family found in the northeastern Atlantic Ocean around Europe and the Mediterranean regions
- Whiting (fish), various other fish species in North America, Australia and throughout the Indo-Pacific region

== Places ==
=== In the United States and Canada ===
- Whiting, Indiana
- Whiting, Iowa
- Whiting, Kansas
- Whiting, Maine
- Whiting, Missouri
- Whiting, New Jersey
- Whiting, Vermont
- Whiting, Wisconsin
- Whiting, Wyoming
- Whiting Bay (Maine), US
- Whiting Farms, Holyoke, Massachusetts, neighborhood
- Whiting Peak (British Columbia), a mountain in British Columbia, Canada
- Whiting Ranch Wilderness Park, a hiking location near Lake Forest, California
- Whiting River, a river in Alaska and British Columbia
- Whiting River (Connecticut), a stream in Massachusetts and Connecticut, US
- Whiting Township, North Dakota, in Bowman County, North Dakota, US
- Whiting Township, Jackson County, Kansas, US

=== Elsewhere ===
- Whiting Bay, Isle of Arran, Scotland
- Mount Whiting, a pyramidal mountain in Antarctica
- Whiting Peak, a scattered group of peaks and nunataks in Antarctica
- Whiting Rocks, a group of three rocks off the coast of Antarctica
- Whitings Hill Open Space, a large public open space in Barnet, England

== People ==
- Whiting (surname), people with the surname Whiting
- Whiting (given name), people with the given name Whiting

== Aviation ==
- Naval Air Station Whiting Field, a United States Navy air base in Florida
  - NAS Whiting Field – North, a section of Naval Air Station Whiting Field
  - NAS Whiting Field – South, a section of Naval Air Station Whiting Field

== Buildings ==
- Whiting Homestead, a house in Connecticut in the United States
- Whiting House (disambiguation), the name of many houses in the United States
- Whiting Refinery, an oil refinery operated by BP
- The Whiting (auditorium), an auditorium in Michigan in the United States

== Education ==
- School City of Whiting, a school district headquartered in Whiting, Indiana, in the United States
- Whiting School of Engineering, a division of The Johns Hopkins University

== Ships ==
- HMS Whiting, the name of several ships of the Royal Navy, including:
  - HMS Whiting, the previous name of the Royal Navy torpedo gunboat HMS Boomerang (1889)
- NOAAS Whiting (S 329), an American survey ship in commission in the National Oceanic and Atmospheric Administration from 1970 to 2003, and previously in commission in the United States Coast and Geodetic Survey from 1963 to 1970 as USC&GS Whiting (CSS 29)
- USS Kenneth Whiting (AV-14), a United States Navy seaplane tender in commission from 1944 to 1947 and from 1951 to 1958
- USS Whiting (SS-433), a proposed United States Navy submarine cancelled in 1944 prior to construction

== Other uses ==
- Chamber of Commerce v. Whiting, a decision by the Supreme Court of the United States
- Whiting reaction, an organic chemical reaction
- Whiting Awards, an American award presented annually to ten emerging writers in fiction, nonfiction, poetry, and plays

== See also ==
- Whitefish (disambiguation)
- Justice Whiting (disambiguation)
- Waiting (disambiguation)
- Weeting
- Weighting
- Whitening (disambiguation)
- Whitin (disambiguation)
- Whitting
