= Whiting (surname) =

Origin
- Language: Old English
- Meaning: The white or fair offspring
- Region of origin: England

The surname Whiting is of Saxon origin meaning 'the white or fair offspring'. The Saxon suffix "-ing" denotes 'son of' or 'offspring'. It is a patronymic name from the Old English pre-7th Century 'Hwita' meaning 'the white' or 'fair one'. The surname first appears in documentation from the late 11th century and has a number of variant forms ranging from 'Whiteing' and 'Whitting' to 'Witting'. However, the name was first found in Devon where it was seated both before and after the Norman Conquest.

In Great Britain, there are an estimated 3,169 individuals with the surname. According to the 1990 U.S. census, Whiting was the 2,565th most popular surname in the United States, carried by 0.005% of the population.

== People ==
- A. Chapin Whiting (1825–1899), member of the Wisconsin State Assembly
- Alan Whiting, British screenwriter
- Albert N. Whiting (1917–2020), President and Chancellor of North Carolina College
- Albert Whiting (cricketer) (1866–1946), Australian cricketer
- Algernon Whiting (1861–1931), English first-class cricketer and tea planter
- Allen S. Whiting (1926–2018), American political scientist specializing in China
- Amber Whiting, American basketball coach
- Anderson Whiting, member of the Wisconsin State Assembly
- Ant Whiting, writer/producer signed to Sony/ATV Music Publishing
- Arthur Batelle Whiting (1861–1936), American teacher, pianist, composer and writer on music
- Arthur Whiting (1878–1938), British politician
- Barbara Whiting (1931–2004), American actress
- Beatrice Blyth Whiting (1914–2003), American anthropologist
- Betty Whiting (1925–1967), American baseball player
- Bob Whiting (1883–1917), a.k.a. Pom Pom Whiting, English footballer
- Brandon Whiting (born 1976), American former football player
- Brendan Whiting 1936–2009, Australian author and researcher
- Calvin Whiting (born 1995), South African-born American rugby union player
- Carl Whiting (born 1981), New Zealand sailor
- Chancey Whiting (1819–1902), Latter Day Saint leader
- Charles Whiting (1926–2007), British writer and military historian
- Charles Whiting (cricketer) (1888–1959), English cricketer
- Charles S. Whiting (1863–1922), associate justice of the South Dakota Supreme Court
- Charlie Whiting (1952–2019), FIA Formula One race director
- Chris Whiting (born 1966), Australian politician
- Cliff Whiting (1936–2017), New Zealand Maori artist
- Ed Whiting (1860–?), American baseball player
- Elizabeth Whiting (born 1952), stage costume designer from New Zealand
- Erle Whiting (1876–1958), fifth president of The Church of Jesus Christ (Cutlerite)
- Fred Whiting (born 1938), American former politician
- Frederic Allen Whiting (1873–1959), advocate for education, pioneer for public outreach and philanthropist
- Frederic Whiting (painter) (1874–1962), English painter
- Gains Whiting (1865–1946), New Zealand trade unionist and political activist
- George Whiting (1840–1923), American composer of classical music
- George A. Whiting (1884–1943), American vaudeville song and dance man
- Gordon Whiting (1942–2018), judge of the Environment Court of New Zealand
- Graham Whiting (born 1946), New Zealand former rugby footballer
- Henry H. Whiting (1923–2012), member of the Supreme Court of Virginia
- Isaac Whiting (1842–1922), the third president of The Church of Jesus Christ (Cutlerite)
- Jack Whiting (cricketer) (1894–1975), English cricketer
- Jack Whiting (actor) (1901–1961), American actor, singer and dancer
- James Whiting (born 1949), known professionally as Sugar Blue, American blues harmonica player
- James R. Whiting (1803–1872), New York judge
- Jeff Whiting (born 1972), American theater director, choreographer, performer and entrepreneur
- Jennifer Whiting, American philosopher
- Jesse Whiting (1879–1937), Major League Baseball pitcher
- Jillian Whiting, Australian news presenter
- Jim Whiting (born 1951), British artist and inventor
- John Lanyon Whiting (1851–1922), Canadian lawyer and politician
- John Whiting (1917–1963), English actor, dramatist and critic
- John Whiting (anthropologist) (1908–1999), American sociologist and anthropologist
- John Whiting (MP) (died 1430), English Member of Parliament and lawyer
- Julian Whiting (1912–2004), seventh president of The Church of Jesus Christ (Cutlerite)
- Justin Rice Whiting (1847–1903), Michigan politician
- Ken Whiting (born 1974), Canadian kayaker
- Kenneth Whiting (1881–1943), United States Navy officer and American pioneer of naval aviation
- Leonard Whiting (born 1950), British actor
- Lilian Whiting (1847–1942), American journalist and author
- Lorenzo D. Whiting (1819–1889), American politician
- Lynn S. Whiting (1939–2017), trainer of Thoroughbred racehorses
- Margaret Whiting (1924–2011), American popular music and country music singer
- Margaret Whiting (actress) (1933–2023), British film and television actress
- Marian Muriel Whiting (1881–1978), British horticulturalist and plant collector
- Mark Whiting (born 1964), American writer, director, designer and actor
- Mary Collins Whiting (1835–1912), American lawyer, businesswoman and teacher
- Michael F. Whiting, American director of the Brigham Young University DNA Sequencing Center
- Michael Whiting (born 1960), American former football fullback in the United States Football League
- Milton Whiting (1922–2010), Australian politician
- Napoleon Whiting (1910–1984), African-American character actor
- Nathan Whiting (1724–1771), soldier and merchant in colonial America
- Nathaniel Whiting (mill owner) (1609–1682), a settler of Dedham, Massachusetts
- Nathaniel N. Whiting (1792–1872), American Baptist preacher
- Norman Whiting (1920–2014), English cricketer
- Onslow Whiting (1872–1937), English sculptor and teacher
- Pat Whiting (1940–2010), American activist and politician
- Paul Whiting, New Zealand yacht designer during the 1970s and early 1980s
- Percy H. Whiting, American author, newspaper reporter and professional speaker
- Peter Whiting (footballer), New Zealand football goalkeeper
- Peter Whiting (rugby union) (born 1946), New Zealand rugby union player
- Richard Whiting (abbot) (died 1539), last abbot of Glastonbury Abbey before Dissolution of the Monasteries
- Richard Whiting (rugby league), English rugby league player
- Richard A. Whiting (1891–1938), writer of popular songs, father of Margaret Whiting and Barbara Whiting Smith
- Richard H. Whiting (1826–1888), U.S. Representative from Illinois
- Robert Whiting (born 1942), American author and journalist
- Ros Whiting (1958–2024), New Zealand accounting academic
- Roy Whiting (born 1959), English murderer
- Rutherford Lester Whiting (1930–2014), Canadian politician
- Ryan Whiting (born 1986), American track and field athlete
- Samuel Whiting, Jr. (1633–1733), First Minister of Billerica, Massachusetts
- Sarah Frances Whiting (1847–1927), American physicist and astronomer
- Sarah Whiting (born 1964), American architect, critic and Dean of the Rice University School of Architecture
- Scott Whiting (born 1978), Australian former rugby league footballer
- Stephen N. Whiting, United States Space Force lieutenant general
- Tossie Whiting (1879–1958), American educator and Dean of Women at Virginia State University
- Tracy Denean Sharpley-Whiting, feminist scholar
- Val Whiting (born 1972), former professional basketball player
- W. H. Whiting Jr. (1862–1949), twice acting president of Hampden–Sydney College
- Walter Whiting (1888–1952), English cricketer
- Warren Whiting (1816–1897), member of the Wisconsin State Assembly
- William Whiting (footballer), English footballer
- William Whiting (poet) (1825–1878), English writer and hymnist wrote the words to Eternal Father, Strong to Save (The Navy Hymn)
- William Whiting (Massachusetts politician) (1813–1873), American congressman from Massachusetts
- William Whiting II (politician) (1841–1911), U.S. Representative from Massachusetts
- William Austin Whiting (1855–1908), American lawyer and politician
- William Dean Whiting (1815–1891), American silversmith and jeweler
- William F. Whiting (1864–1936), Massachusetts politician, United States Secretary of Commerce 1928–1929
- William H. C. Whiting (1824–1865), American Civil War army officer
- Zach Whiting (born 1987), Iowa state senator

== Fictional characters ==
- Andrea Whiting, on the American soap opera Search for Tomorrow
- Danny Whiting, on the BBC soap opera EastEnders

== See also ==
- Waiting (disambiguation)
- Weeting
- Weighting
- Whitening (disambiguation)
- Whitin (disambiguation)
- Whitting
