= Whiting (given name) =

Whiting is a given name. Notable people with the name include:

- Almon Whiting Babbitt (1812–1856), early leader in the Latter Day Saint movement
- George Whiting Badman (1886–1953), South Australian business man, horse breeder and owner
- Carl Whiting Bishop (1881–1942), American archeologist specializing in East Asian civilizations
- Richard Whiting Blue (1841–1907), U.S. Representative from Kansas
- William Whiting Boardman (1794–1871), politician and United States Representative from Connecticut
- William Whiting Borden (1887–1913), philanthropist and millionaire Christian missionary candidate
- George Whiting Flagg (1816–1897), was an American painter of historical scenes and genre pictures
- Whiting Griswold (1814–1874), American abolitionist, lawyer and politician
- Francis Whiting Halsey (1851–1919), American journalist, editor and historian
- Gerry Whiting Hazelton (1829–1920), American lawyer and Republican politician
- Caroline Lee Whiting Hentz (1800–1856), American novelist and author
- Luther Whiting Mason (1818–1896), American music educator hired by the Meiji period government of Japan
- Christine Whiting Parmenter (1877–1953), American author
- Rex Whiting Pearson (1905–1961), Australian politician
- Lucien Whiting Powell (1846–1930), landscape painter who gave the village of Airmont, Virginia its name
- Barbara Whiting Smith (1931–2004), actress in movies and on radio and television
- Joseph Whiting Stock (1815–1855), American painter of portraits, miniatures, and landscape paintings
- Walker Whiting Vick (1878–1926), aide to Woodrow Wilson in 1912, officer of the Democratic National Committee
- Whiting Willauer (1906–1962), American ambassador to Costa Rica and Honduras
- Whiting Williams (1878–1975), author, co-founder of the Welfare Federation of Cleveland
- Charles Whiting Wooster, Commander-in-Chief of the Chilean Navy

== See also ==
- Waiting (disambiguation)
- Weeting
- Weighting
- Whitening (disambiguation)
- Whitin (disambiguation)
- Whitting
