= Frederic Whiting =

Frederic Whiting may refer to:

- Frederic Whiting (painter) (1874–1962), English painter
- Frederic Allen Whiting (1873–1959), American philanthropist and museum director
