= James Whiting =

James Whiting may refer to:

- James Whiting (born 1949), known professionally as Sugar Blue, American blues harmonica player
- James Whiting, fictional character in the American TV series The Wire
- James H. Whiting (1848–1919), American industrialist and automobile pioneer
- James R. Whiting (1803–1872), American lawyer and politician

== See also ==
- Whiting (disambiguation)
