= Don't Keep Me Waiting =

Don't Keep Me Waiting may refer to:

- "Don't Keep Me Waiting", a song by Montell Jordan from This Is How We Do It
- "Don't Keep Me Waiting", a song by Silk from Lose Control
- "Don't Keep Me Waiting", a song by Britney Spears from Femme Fatale
- "Don't Keep Me Waiting", a song by Sharleen Spiteri from Melody

== See also ==
- Waiting (disambiguation)
