= Gertrude Whiting =

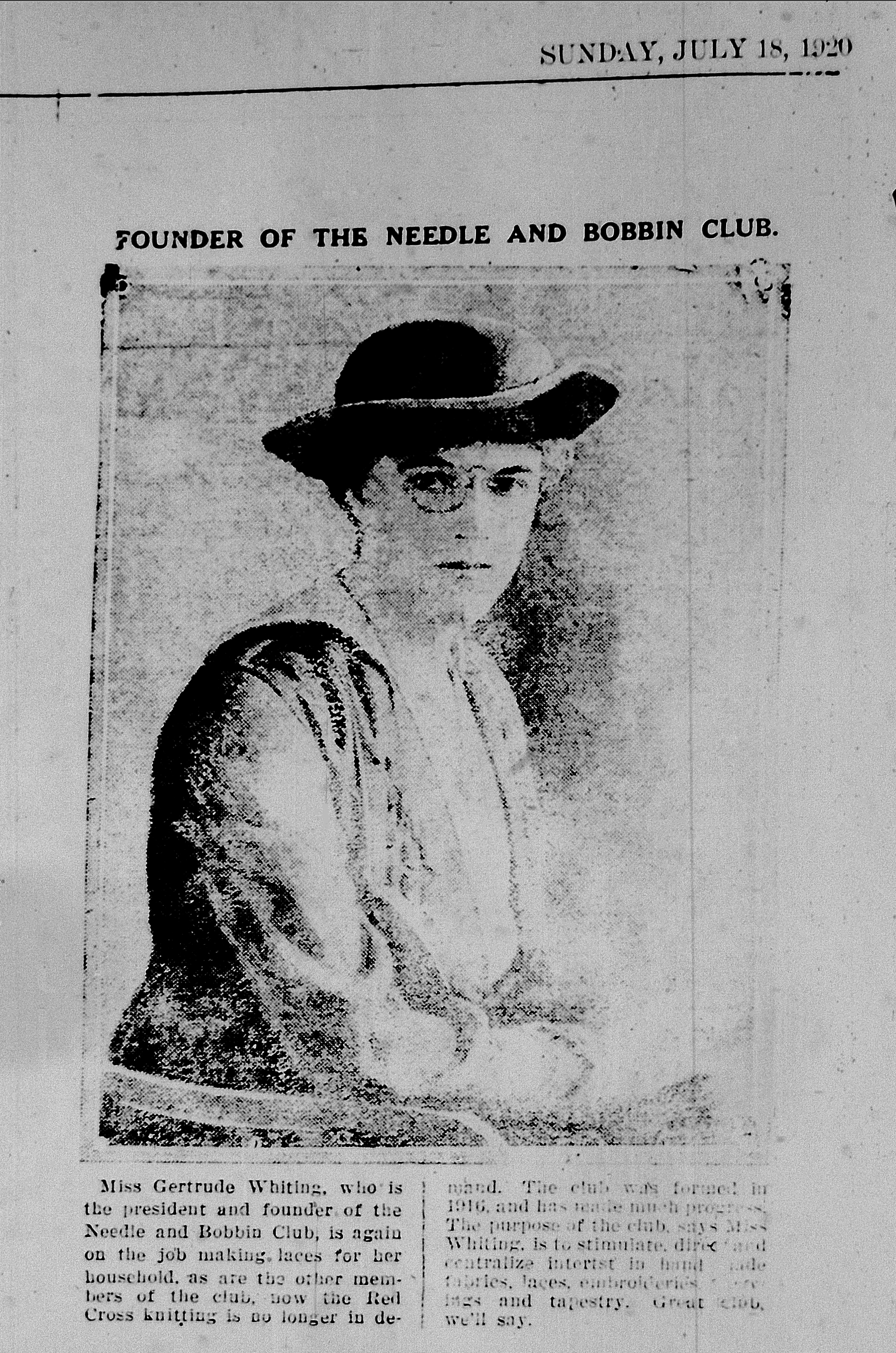
- Born: 1882; New York City, New York, United States
- Died: 1951; New York City, New York, United States
- Education: Hollins University
- Organization(s): Needle and Bobbin Club
- Known for: Lace-making

Gertrude Whiting (1882–1951) was the founder of the Needle and Bobbin Club in New York City. Whiting was an expert in lace making and taught the art to women in rural India. She was a fellow of the British Royal Society of Arts, and named a Master Craftsman by The Society of Arts and Crafts of Boston.

== Life ==
Whiting was born in 1882 in New York City. She was introduced to lace by her aunt at a young age. She attended the Rye Seminary and graduated from Hollins University. She studied needlework in Switzerland, England, and Nova Scotia. In 1951, Whiting died in New York City at the age of 69.

== Career ==
After returning to the United States, Whiting found lace was not as popular in the country compared to Europe. Through her connection with Frances Morris, the assistant curator of lace at the Metropolitan Museum of Art, she connected lace enthusiasts together through the newly formed Needle and Bobbin Club in 1916. The club amassed 200 members within its first year. As the President of the Needle and Bobbin Club, research and study of rare laces was undertaken at the regular club meetings.

Whiting's personal collections consisted of lace and bobbins, including:

In her collection of 400 bobbins are several once used by Jean Jacques Rousseau, whose skill at lace-making was an expression of an artistic endowment, which was better known through his literary work.

As a lacemaker, Whiting compiled an early catalog of the various stitches used in typical bobbin lace patterns, which also displayed various regional styles of lace bobbins. Her original sampler can be found in The Metropolitan Museum of Art, and reproductions of the sampler were included in a pocket of the guide book she published. Whiting was invited by an examiner from the Indian Department of Education and Industry to advise in the country's economic development of lace making. She re-introduced lace making to women in rural India. Speaking engagements included details of the program in India, including the training required.

Miss Whiting, who was the guest of honor at the Kresge-Newark "Magazine of the Air" broadcast said that it takes at least two years to teach the women of a village to ply their craft sufficiently skillfully to achieve standards demanded for sale-ability.

The Whiting India Guilds continued to exist until 1965. In 1940, Whiting was honored for her work by becoming a fellow of the British Royal Society of Arts.

== Gallery ==
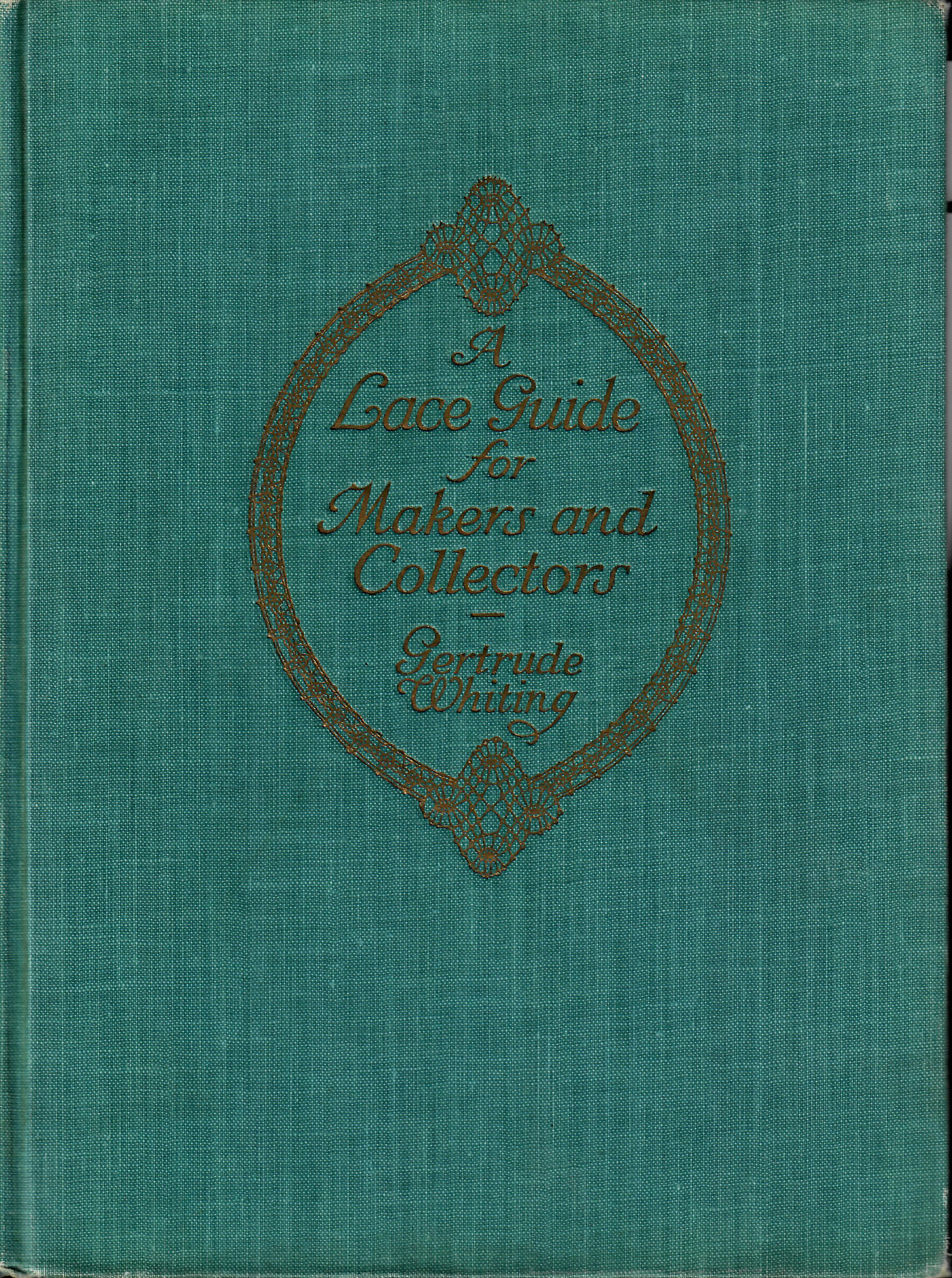
Original cover of Gertrude Whiting's Lace Guide book

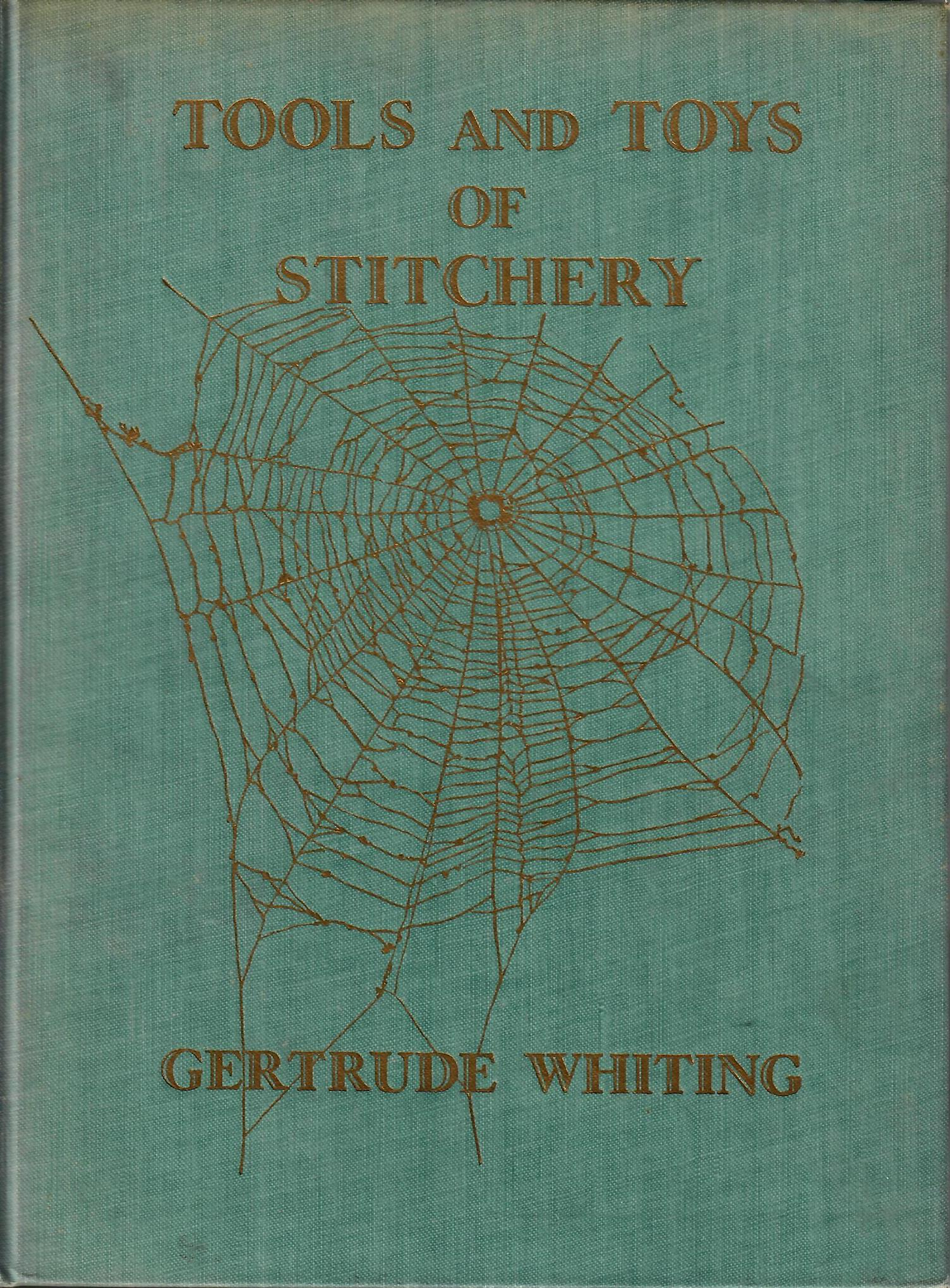
The original cover of Tools and Toys of Stitchery by Gertrude Whiting

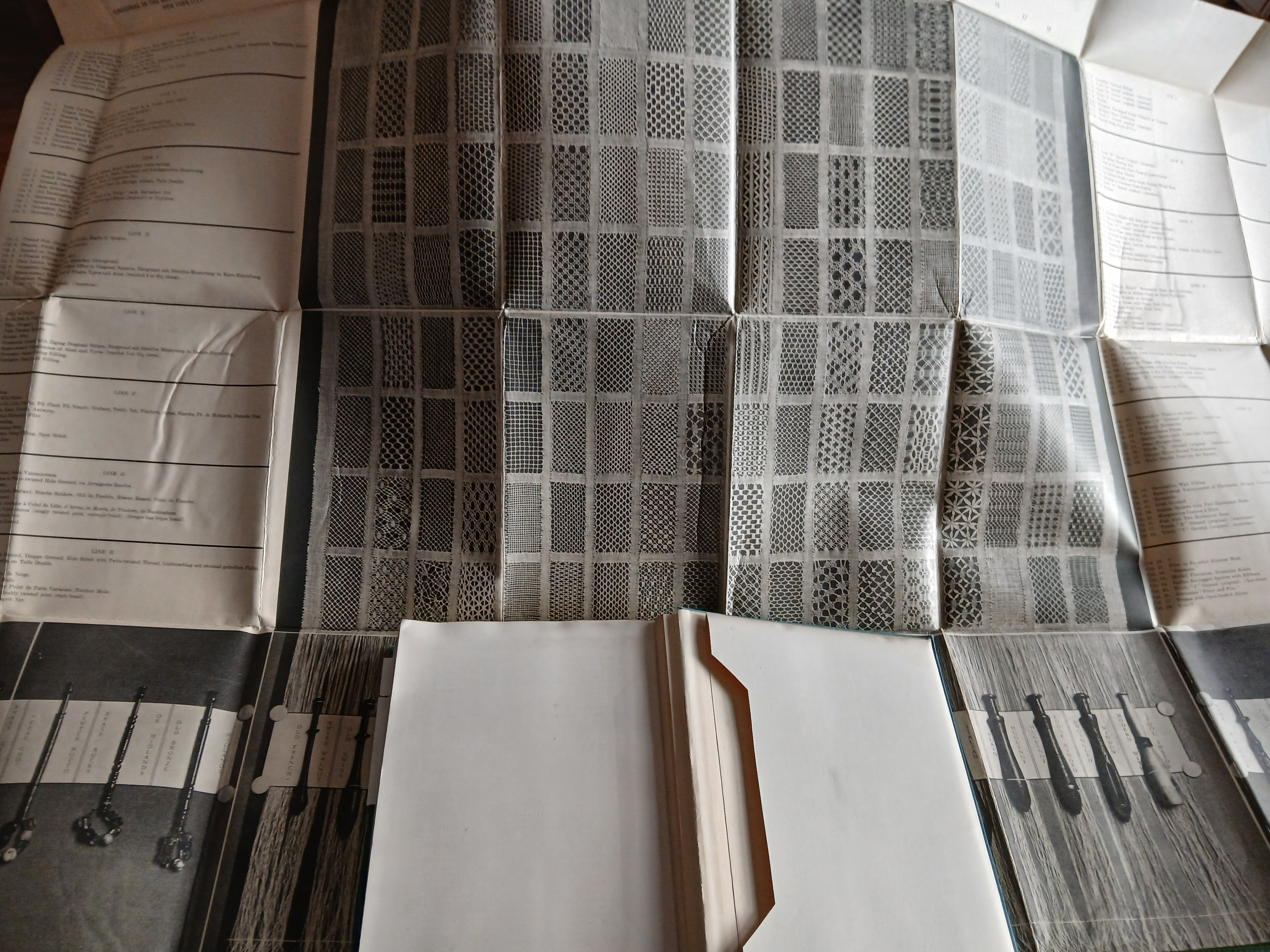
Whiting's book pocket with the fold-out large linen photographic reproduction of her lace sampler

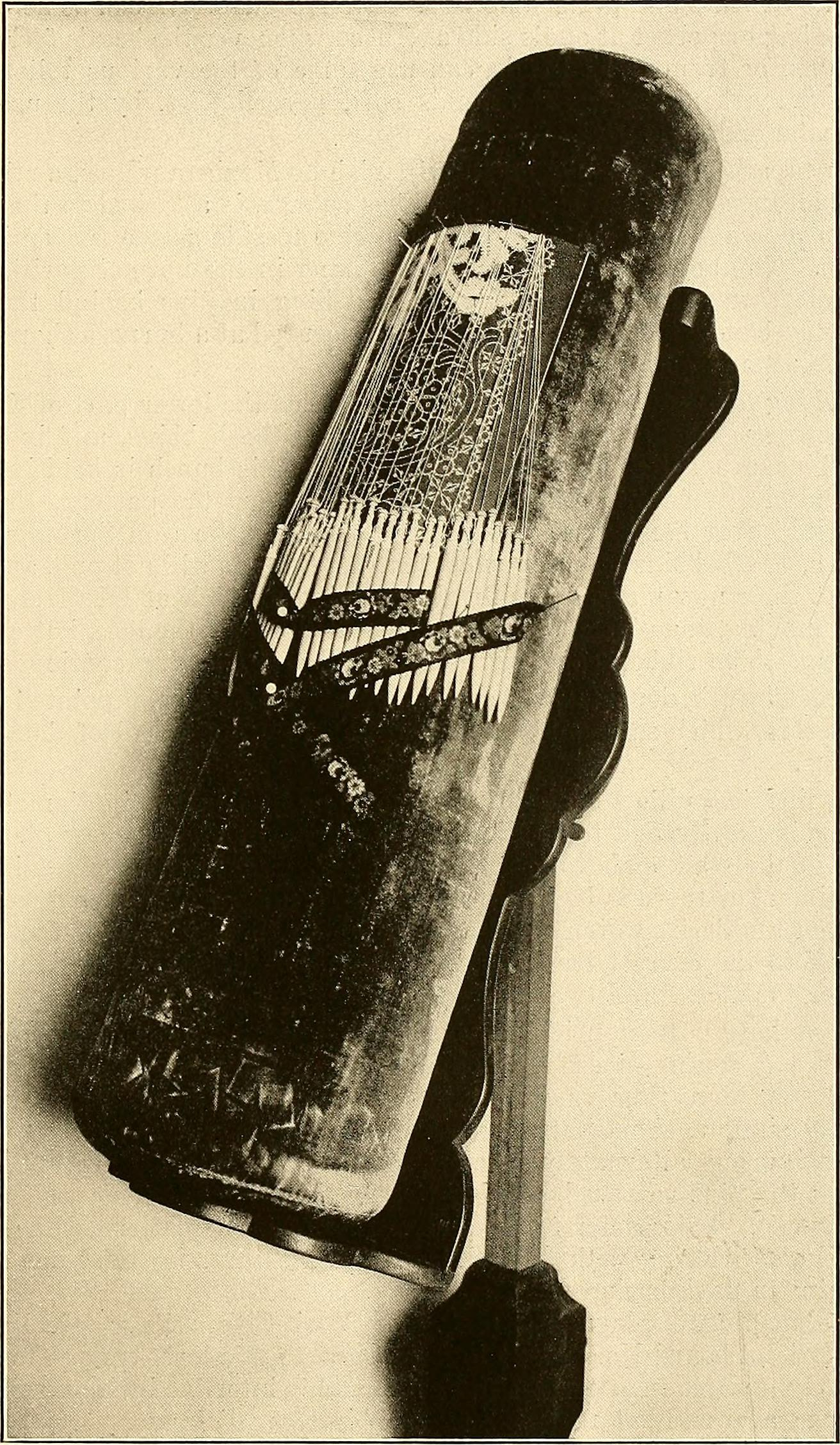
Photo from Whiting's A lace guide for makers and collectors (1920)

== Publications ==
Whiting published books about making lace to teach the craft, and about the history of lace and lacemaking.

- Whiting, Gertrude (1971-11-30). Old-Time Tools & Toys of Needlework. Dover Publications. ISBN 978-0486225173.
- Whiting, Gertrude (1928). Tools and Toys of Stitchery. Columbia University Press.
- Whiting, Gertrude (1920). A Lace Guide For Makers And Collectors. New York: E. P. Dutton.
- Whiting, Gertrude (ed.) (1935) La Révolte des Passemens. The Needle and Bobbin Club, New York.
