= Lorenzo D. Whiting =

American politician

Member of the Illinois Senate from the 25th district
- In office 1882–1886
- Preceded by: Meredith Walker
- Succeeded by: Edward A. Washburn

Member of the Illinois Senate from the 19th district
- In office 1872–1882
- Preceded by: redistricted
- Succeeded by: redistricted

Member of the Illinois Senate from the 21st district
- In office 1870–1872
- Preceded by: new district
- Succeeded by: redistricted

Personal details
- Born: November 17, 1819 Arcadia, New York
- Died: October 10, 1889 (aged 69)
- Party: Republican
- Profession: Farmer

Lorenzo Dow Whiting (November 17, 1819 – October 10, 1889) was an American politician from New York. Born to an early American family, Whiting worked as a store clerk before moving to Illinois in 1838 to study patent law. After a seven-year return to New York, Whiting established a farm in Bureau County, Illinois, which became one of the most prosperous in the region. This led to his being elected as township supervisor, then to the Illinois General Assembly. He served in the assembly for eighteen years: two as a representative and sixteen as a senator. He was known for his advocacy of canals and opposition to railroads. He was the father of journalist Lilian Whiting.

== Biography ==
Lorenzo Dow Whiting was born in Arcadia, New York, on November 17, 1819. He was a descendant of Cotton Mather through his mother, Zilpha. Whiting attended school then worked as a clerk in Olcott, New York until he was eighteen. He then set out for Illinois, working in patent rights for four years. Whiting returned to New York in 1842 to teach and oversee the schools in Newfane. He also served as a justice of the peace. In 1849, he returned to Illinois to teach, initially settling near Wyanet. However, he quickly abandoned his teaching ambitions to focus on farming, purchasing a farm near Tiskilwa. Whiting amassed 600 acres (240 ha) of land, making his farm one of the largest in the area and bringing him to local prominence.

Whiting was named a supervisor of Indiantown Township, Bureau County, Illinois, served for five or six years, then was elected to the Illinois House of Representatives as a Republican in 1868. Shortly thereafter, he was elected as a delegate to the 1870 Constitution of Illinois Convention. There, Whiting successfully advocated for a provision empowering the general assembly to regulate the railroad business. After his two-year term in the state house, Whiting was elected to the Illinois Senate in 1870. He would serve in that body until 1886 and was noted for his advocation of the Hennepin Canal. Whiting also wrote the bill that passed the Illinois and Michigan Canal to the federal government.

Whiting married Lucretia C. Clement in 1846. They had three children before she died in 1872. Eldest son Clement A. became a professor at the Pacific School of Osteopathy in Los Angeles. Herbert L., the middle child, maintained the land holdings in Illinois after Lorenzo's death. Daughter Emily Lilian became a journalist (under the name Lilian Whiting) in Boston, Massachusetts. Whiting married Eriphyle Robinson in 1874. He died on October 10, 1889, and was buried in Mount Bloom Cemetery in Tiskilwa.
