= Still Waiting =

Still Waiting may refer to:

- "Still Waiting" (Prince song)
- "Still Waiting", a Suede song from Autofiction
- "Still Waiting" (Sum 41 song)
- "Still Waiting", a Tom Chaplin song from The Wave
- "Still Waiting" (Uncanny X-Men song)
- Still Waiting..., a 2009 sequel to the film Waiting...

== See also ==
- I'm Still Waiting (disambiguation)
- Waiting (disambiguation)
