= Indiantown Township, Bureau County, Illinois =

Indiantown Township
- Township
- Location in Bureau County

- Bureau County's location in Illinois
- Coordinates: 41°16′41″N 89°34′08″W
- Country: United States
- State: Illinois
- County: Bureau
- Established: November 6, 1849

Area
  - Total: 36.41 sq mi (94.3 km^{2})
  - Land: 36.33 sq mi (94.1 km^{2})
  - Water: 0.08 sq mi (0.21 km^{2}) 0.22%
- Elevation: 843 ft (257 m)

Population (2020)
  - Total: 593
  - Density: 16.3/sq mi (6.30/km^{2})
- Time zone: UTC-6 (CST)
  - Summer (DST): UTC-5 (CDT)
- ZIP codes: 61314, 61356, 61368, 61379, 61421
- FIPS code: 17-011-37413

Indiantown Township is one of twenty-five townships in Bureau County, Illinois, USA. As of the 2020 census, its population was 593 and it contained 299 housing units.

== Geography ==
According to the 2010 census, the township has a total area of 36.41 square miles (94.3 km^{2}), of which 36.33 square miles (94.1 km^{2}) (or 99.78%) is land and 0.08 square miles (0.21 km^{2}) (or 0.22%) is water.

=== Cities ===
- Tiskilwa (west half)

=== Unincorporated towns ===
- Providence

=== Cemeteries ===
The township contains five cemeteries:

- Catholic
- Mount Bloom
- Oak Hill
- Saint Marys
- Willow Springs

=== Lakes ===
- Menno-Haven Lake

== Demographics ==
As of the 2020 census there were 593 people, 249 households, and 153 families residing in the township. The population density was 16.29 inhabitants per square mile (6.29/km^{2}). There were 299 housing units at an average density of 8.21 per square mile (3.17/km^{2}). The racial makeup of the township was 95.62% White, 0.00% African American, 0.00% Native American, 0.00% Asian, 0.00% Pacific Islander, 0.17% from other races, and 4.22% from two or more races. Hispanic or Latino of any race were 1.69% of the population.

There were 249 households, out of which 30.50% had children under the age of 18 living with them, 50.20% were married couples living together, 5.62% had a female householder with no spouse present, and 38.55% were non-families. 27.30% of all households were made up of individuals, and 10.00% had someone living alone who was 65 years of age or older. The average household size was 2.53 and the average family size was 3.21.

The township's age distribution consisted of 20.5% under the age of 18, 8.6% from 18 to 24, 22.8% from 25 to 44, 30.4% from 45 to 64, and 17.6% who were 65 years of age or older. The median age was 43.3 years. For every 100 females, there were 107.6 males. For every 100 females age 18 and over, there were 103.3 males.

The median income for a household in the township was $70,282, and the median income for a family was $70,625. Males had a median income of $55,625 versus $24,125 for females. The per capita income for the township was $28,481. About 7.2% of families and 11.0% of the population were below the poverty line, including 16.3% of those under age 18 and 7.2% of those age 65 or over.

Historical population
Census	Pop.	Note	%±
2010	711		—
2020	593		−16.6%
US Decennial Census

== School districts ==
- Bradford Community Unit School District 1
- Bureau Valley Community Unit School District 340

== Political districts ==
- Illinois's 11th congressional district
- State House District 73
- State Senate District 37
