= I'm Still Waiting =

I'm Still Waiting may refer to:

- "I'm Still Waiting" (Jodeci song), 1991
- "I'm Still Waiting" (Curtis Mayfield song), 1966
- "I'm Still Waiting" (Diana Ross song), 1971
  - Ross' album Surrender, released as I'm Still Waiting in the UK
- "I'm Still Waitin'", 1998 song by Sasha

== See also ==
- Still Waiting (disambiguation)
