= Providence, Illinois =

- Unincorporated community
- Location within Illinois Location within the United States
- Coordinates: 41°16′41″N 89°35′33″W
- Country: United States
- State: Illinois
- County: Bureau
- Elevation: 925 ft (282 m)
- Time zone: UTC-6 (Central (CST))
  - Summer (DST): UTC-5 (CDT)
- Area codes: 815 & 779
- GNIS feature ID: 416247

Providence is an unincorporated community in Bureau County, Illinois, United States, located west-southwest of Tiskilwa.

In 1836, a group of 72 stockholders from Providence, Rhode Island created plans for a colony in Illinois. The group purchased 17,000 acres of land. In 1837, around 40 people came to live on the land which became Providence.
