= Arispie Township, Bureau County, Illinois =

Arispie Township
- Township
- Location in Bureau County

- Bureau County's location in Illinois
- Coordinates: 41°16′33″N 89°27′05″W
- Country: United States
- State: Illinois
- County: Bureau
- Established: November 6, 1849

Area
  - Total: 36.43 sq mi (94.4 km^{2})
  - Land: 36.27 sq mi (93.9 km^{2})
  - Water: 0.16 sq mi (0.41 km^{2}) 0.44%
- Elevation: 653 ft (199 m)

Population (2020)
  - Total: 763
  - Density: 21.0/sq mi (8.12/km^{2})
- Time zone: UTC-6 (CST)
  - Summer (DST): UTC-5 (CDT)
- ZIP codes: 61356, 61368
- FIPS code: 17-011-02076

Arispie Township is one of twenty-five townships in Bureau County, Illinois, United States. As of the 2020 census, its population was 763 and it contained 355 housing units.

== Geography ==
According to the 2010 census, the township has a total area of 36.43 square miles (94.4 km^{2}), of which 36.27 square miles (93.9 km^{2}) (or 99.56%) is land and 0.16 square miles (0.41 km^{2}) (or 0.44%) is water.

=== Cities ===
- Tiskilwa (east half)

=== Major highways ===
- Interstate 180
- Illinois Route 26
- Illinois Route 29

=== Lakes ===
- Goose Lake

== Demographics ==
As of the 2020 census there were 763 people, 398 households, and 243 families residing in the township. The population density was 20.93 inhabitants per square mile (8.08/km^{2}). There were 355 housing units at an average density of 9.74 per square mile (3.76/km^{2}). The racial makeup of the township was 92.27% White, 0.39% African American, 0.66% Native American, 0.79% Asian, 0.00% Pacific Islander, 0.79% from other races, and 5.11% from two or more races. Hispanic or Latino people of any race were 2.49% of the population.

There were 398 households, out of which 29.90% had children under the age of 18 living with them, 52.01% were married couples living together, 6.28% had a female householder with no spouse present, and 38.94% were non-families. 36.70% of all households were made up of individuals, and 12.60% had someone living alone who was 65 years of age or older. The average household size was 2.29 and the average family size was 2.97.

The township's age distribution consisted of 21.7% under the age of 18, 13.4% from 18 to 24, 16.2% from 25 to 44, 26.4% from 45 to 64, and 22.3% who were 65 years of age or older. The median age was 43.3 years. For every 100 females, there were 121.4 males. For every 100 females age 18 and over, there were 101.1 males.

The median income for a household in the township was $48,654, and the median income for a family was $61,858. Males had a median income of $41,786 versus $15,568 for females. The per capita income for the township was $26,835. About 9.1% of families and 9.9% of the population were below the poverty line, including 13.6% of those under age 18 and 5.4% of those age 65 or over.

Historical population
Census	Pop.	Note	%±
2010	776		—
2020	763		−1.7%
U.S. Decennial Census

== Political districts ==
- Illinois' 11th congressional district
- State House District 73
- State Senate District 37
