= Patience =

Ability to endure difficult circumstances

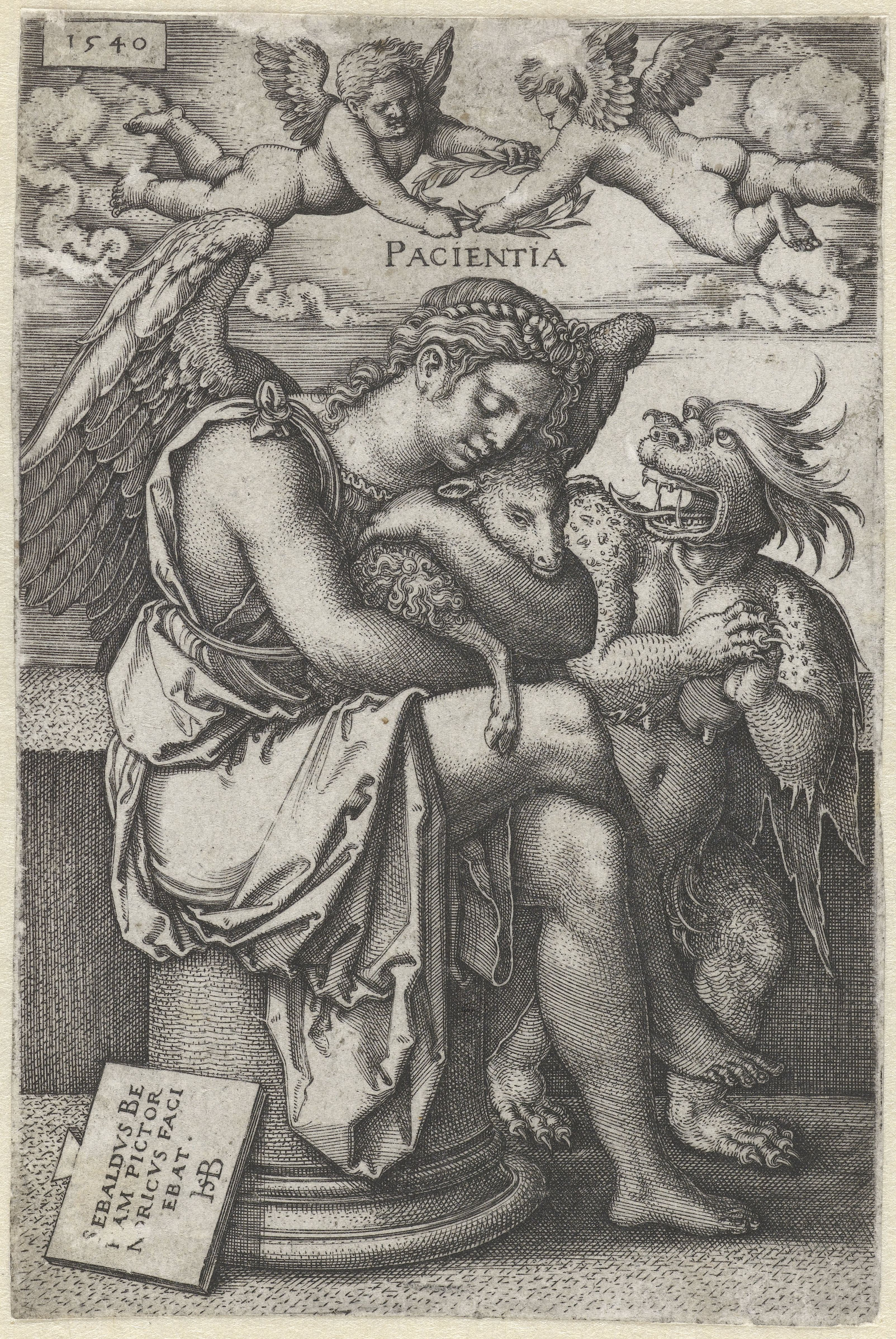
Patience, engraving by Hans Sebald Beham, 1540

Patience, or forbearance, is the ability to endure difficult or undesired long-term circumstances. Patience involves resilience or tolerance in the face of delay, provocation, or stress without responding negatively, such as reacting with disrespect or anger. Patience is also used to refer to the character trait of being disciplined and steadfast. Antonyms of patience include impatience, hastiness, and impetuousness.

== Scientific perspectives ==
In psychology and in cognitive neuroscience, patience is studied as a decision-making problem, involving the choice of either a small reward in the short-term, versus a more valuable reward in the long-term.

In a 2005 study, common marmosets and cottontop tamarins chose between taking an immediate small reward and waiting a variable amount of time for a large reward. Under these conditions, marmosets waited significantly longer for food than tamarins. This difference cannot be explained by life history, social behaviour, or brain size. It can, however, be explained by feeding ecology: marmosets rely on gum, a food product acquired by waiting for exudate to flow from trees, whereas tamarins feed on insects, a food product requiring impulsive action. Foraging ecology, therefore, may provide a selective pressure for the evolution of self-control.

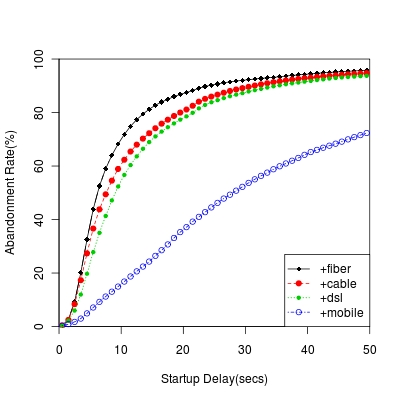
Patience in waiting for a video to start is impacted by the Internet speeds that one is accustomed to. Users accustomed to faster Internet connectivity (e.g., fiber) abandon a slow-loading video at a faster rate than users with slower Internet connectivity (e.g., cable or mobile).

Patience of human users in the online world has been a subject of research. In a 2012 study of tens of millions of users who watched videos on the Internet, Krishnan and Sitaraman showed that users lose patience in as little as two seconds while waiting for their chosen video to start playing. Users who connect to the Internet at faster speeds are less patient than their counterparts at slower speeds, demonstrating a link between the human expectation of speed and human patience. These and other studies of patience led commentators to conclude that the rapid pace of technology is rewiring humans to be less patient.

== Religious perspectives ==
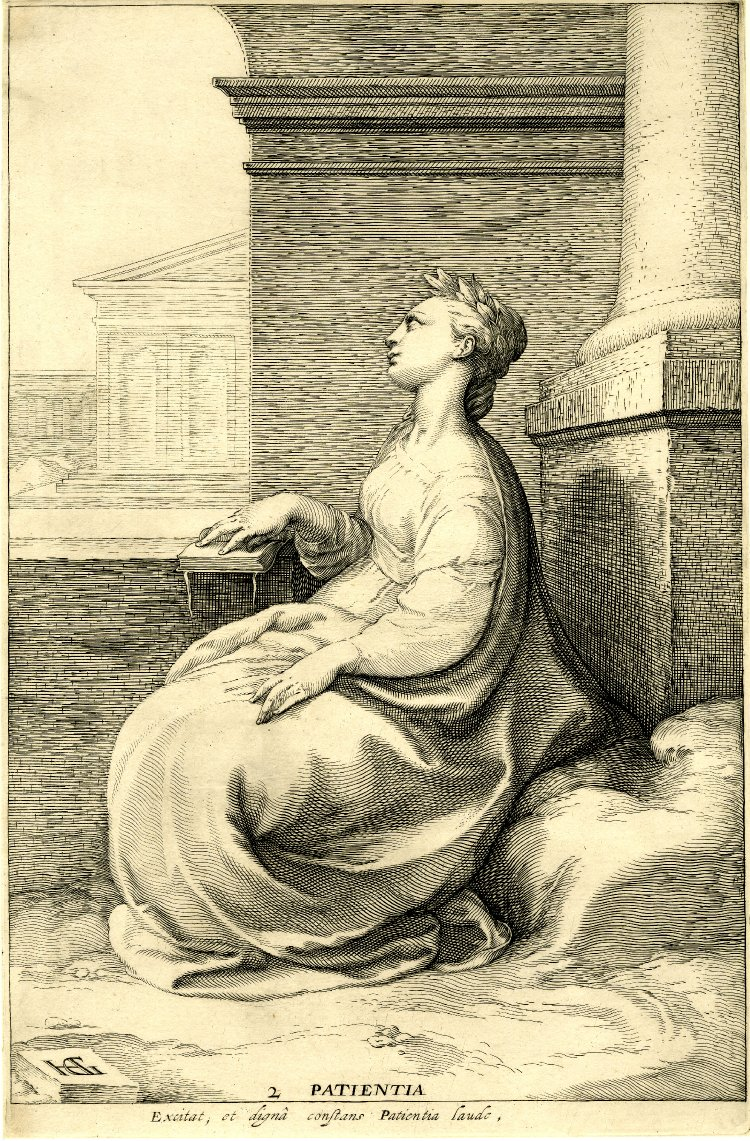
Three virtues by Jan Saenredam after Hendrik Goltzius. This is plate 2, entitled Patientia.

Patience and fortitude are prominent themes in Judaism. The Talmud extols patience as an important personal trait. The story of Micah, for example, is that he suffers many challenging conditions and yet endures, saying "I will wait for the God who saves me." Patience in God, it is said, will aid believers in finding the strength to be delivered from the evils that are inherent in the physical life.

In the Christian religion, patience is one of the most valuable virtues. The Holy Ghost increases patience in the Christian who has accepted the gift of salvation. While patience is not one of the traditional biblical three theological virtues or one of the traditional cardinal virtues, it is part of the fruit of the Holy Spirit, according to the Apostle Paul in his Epistle to the Galatians. Patience was included in later formulations of the seven virtues.

In Islam, patience with steadfast belief in Allah is called sabr (Arabic: صَبْرٌ ṣabr), one of the best virtues in Islam. Through sabr, a Muslim believes that an individual can grow closer to God and thus attain true peace. Islam stresses that Allah is with those who are patient, more specifically during calamity and suffering. Several verses in Quran urge Muslims to seek Allah's help when faced with fear and loss, with patient prayers and perseverance for Allah. In Islamic tradition, Job (Arabic: أيوب, romanized: Ayyūb) demonstrated patience and steadfast belief in Allah.

In Buddhism, patience (Kshanti) is one of the "perfections" (paramitas) that a bodhisattva trains in and practices to realize perfect enlightenment (bodhi). The Buddhist concept of patience is distinct from the English definition of the word. In Buddhism, patience refers to not returning harm, rather than merely enduring a difficult situation. It is the ability to control one's emotions even when being criticized or attacked. Verse 184 of the Dhammapada says "enduring patience is the highest austerity".

Patience/forbearance is considered an essential virtue in Hinduism. In ancient literature of Hinduism, the concept of patience is referred to with the word pariksaha (patience and forbearance, Sanskrit: परिषहा), and several other words such as sahiṣṇutā (patient toleration, Sanskrit: सहिष्णुता), titiksha (forbearance, Sanskrit: तितिक्षा), sah or sahanshilata (suffer with patience, Sanskrit: सह, सहनशीलता) and several others. Patience, in Hindu philosophy, is the cheerful endurance of trying conditions and the consequence of one's action and deeds (karma). It is also the capacity to wait, to endure opposites—such as pain and pleasure, cold and heat, sorrows and joys—calmly, without anxiety, and without a desire to seek revenge. In interpersonal relationships, virtuous titiksha means that if someone attacks or insults without cause, one must endure it without feeling enmity, anger, resentment, or anxiety. Patience is explained as being more than trust, as a value that reflects the state of one's body and mind. The term pariksaha is sometimes also translated as test or exam, in other contexts. Some of these concepts have been carried into the spiritual understanding of yoga. Sandilya Upanishad of Hinduism identifies ten sources of patience and forbearance. In each of these ten forbearances, the virtuous implicit belief is that our current spirit and the future for everyone, including oneself, will be stronger if these forbearances are one's guide. The ten pariksaha are:

Ahimsa (non-violence)	not being violent to any human being or any living being at any time either through one's action, with words one speaks or writes, or in one's thoughts
Satya	expressing and acting with truth
Asteya	not coveting of another's property through any act of one's mind, speech, or body
Brahmacharya	willingness to remain a bachelor by one's actions of mind, speech, or body
Daya	unconditional kindness to everyone and all creatures
Arjava	the refusal to deceive or wrong others either by the performance or by non-performance of actions of one's mind, speech, or body
Kshama	acceptance of suffering while forgiving all pleasant or unpleasant things, such as praise or blows from others
Dhriti	the will to remain of calm mind and spirit during periods of gain or loss of wealth or relatives
Mitahara	moderation and restraint in consumption of food, drinks, and wealth
Saucha	the cleansing of the body by earth and water; and of the mind by the pursuit of understanding oneself

The spiritual teacher Meher Baba stated that "[O]ne of the first requirements of the [spiritual] aspirant is that he should combine unfailing enthusiasm with unyielding patience.... Spiritual effort demands not only physical endurance and courage, but also unshrinking forbearance and unassailable moral courage."

== Philosophical perspectives ==
Levius fit patientia, quicquid corrigere est nefas

(What cannot be quite cured, is made easier by patience)

— Horace, Odes I.24 ("To Virgil on the Death of Quintilius")

In his 1878 book Human, All Too Human, philosopher Friedrich Nietzsche argued that "being able to wait is so hard that the greatest poets did not disdain to make the inability to wait the theme of their poetry". He notes that "Passion will not wait", and gives the example of cases of duels, in which the "advising friends have to determine whether the parties involved might be able to wait a while longer. If they cannot, then a duel is reasonable [because]... to wait would be to continue suffering the horrible torture of offended honor...".

== See also ==
- Marshmallow test – 1970 study on delayed gratification
- Moral character – Steady moral qualities in people
- Queueing § Psychology – Psychological insight into people's queuing behavior
- Self control § Research – Research into an aspect of inhibitory control
- Slow movement (culture) – Social movement
- Time – Continuous progression from past to future
- Toleration – Allowing or permitting something that one disapproves
- Waiting (disambiguation)
