= Whiting House =

Whiting House can refer to buildings in the United States, listed by state first, then city/town:

- Lawler-Whiting House, Talladega, in the National Register of Historic Places listings in Talladega County, Alabama
- Whiting Homestead, West Hartford, on the National Register of Historic Places in Hartford County, Connecticut
- Newell A. Whiting House, Onawa, in the National Register of Historic Places listings in Monona County, Iowa
- Samuel Kidder Whiting House, Ellsworth, in the National Register of Historic Places listings in Hancock County, Maine
- Timothy A. Whiting House, Rochester, in the National Register of Historic Places listings in Olmsted County, Minnesota
- Oliver Whiting Homestead, Wilton, in the National Register of Historic Places listings in Hillsborough County, New Hampshire
- Whiting House (Glenville, West Virginia), Glenville, in the National Register of Historic Places listings in West Virginia
- Frank B. Whiting House, Neenah, in the National Register of Historic Places listings in Winnebago County, Wisconsin
