= Whiting Peak =

Antarctic peak named after L. Whiting

Whiting Peak (80°2′S 159°29′E) is a peak (c.1300 m) located 5.5 nautical miles (10 km) east of the north part of Gaylord Ridge in Nebraska Peaks. Named by Advisory Committee on Antarctic Names (US-ACAN) after L. Whiting, a member of the United States Antarctic Research Program (USARP) geophysical field party, Ross Ice Shelf Project, 1973–74 and 1974-75 field seasons.

It has an elevation of 307 metres (1007 ft) and a prominence of 27 metres (89 ft) in the Metacomet Ridge.
