= Percy H. Whiting =

Amerie writer & speaker

Percy H. Whiting (1880–1967) was an American author, newspaper reporter, sports editor, advertising writer, salesman, and professional speaker. From Chappaqua, New York, he rose to become Vice President of Dale Carnegie & Associates. He dedicated each of his books to his wife Gene.

== Biography ==
Percy H. Whiting was born in Great Barrington, Massachusetts on April 10, 1880.

He died in Montrose, Alabama on August 7, 1967.

== Bibliography ==
- The 5 Great Rules of Selling, McGraw-Hill (1957, rev.1978 by Dale Carnegie & Assoc.)
- How to Speak and Write with Humor, McGraw-Hill (1959)
- The Five Greats Problems of Salesmen and How to Solve Them, McGraw-Hill (1964)

== Discography ==
- Speaking For Profit, Businessmen's Record Club (1961) USA
