= What So Not discography =

- Studio albums: 1
- EPs: 4
- Singles: 16
- Remixes: 21

The discography of Australian electronic music producer What So Not consists of one studio album, four extended plays, 16 singles, and 21 remixes.

== Studio albums ==
Title	Details	Peak chart positions	
Title	Details	AUS	US Dance
Not All the Beautiful Things	Released: 9 March 2018; Label: Counter Records / Sweat It Out; Formats: Digital download, CD, vinyl	14	8
Anomaly	Scheduled: 16 September 2022; Label: Sweat It Out, Warner Music Australia; Formats: Digital download	—	—

== Extended plays ==
Title	Details	Peak chart positions	
Title	Details	AUS	US Dance
7 Dollar Bill	Released: 13 November 2011; Label: Sweat It Out	—	—
The Quack	Released: 25 June 2013; Label: OWSLA / Sweat It Out!	—	—
Gemini	Released: April 2015; Label: OWSLA / Sweat It Out!	85	—
Divide & Conquer	Released: 9 September 2016; Label: OWSLA / Sweat It Out!	19	14
Motions	Released: 16 August 2024; Label: Create Music	—	—
The Quiet That Hurts (with Buunshin)	Released: 5 December 2025; Label:	—	—
I Saw a Trap DJ and It Changed My Bio Chemistry	Released: 14 August 2026; Label: My Sanity	—	—
"—" denotes a recording that did not chart or was not released.

== Charted and/or certified singles ==
Title	Year	Peak chart positions			Certification	Album
Title	Year	AUS	NZ Hot	US Dance	Certification	Album
"High You Are"	2013	—	—	42	RMNZ: Gold	The Quack
"Gemini" (featuring George Maple)	2015	52	—	—	RMNZ: Gold	Gemini
"Feel It" (with Tunji Ice)	2016	—	—	—	RMNZ: Gold	Good Times Ahead
"Lone" (with Ganz featuring Joy)	2016	67	—	—	ARIA: Gold	Divide & Conquer
"We Can Be Friends" (featuring Herizen)	2019	—	30	—		Non-album single
"—" denotes a recording that did not chart or was not released.

== Other appearances ==
List of other non-single song appearances
Title	Year	Album
"Mercy" (with MØ and Two Feet)	2018	Forever Neverland
"Stand 'Em Up" (with Daniel Johns)	2022	FutureNever

== Remixes ==
List of remixes, showing year released and original artists
Title	Year	Original artist(s)
"Style" (What So Not Remix)	2010	Peking Duk
"Let's All Go to London" (What So Not Remix)	2010	Mark Lam (featuring A Girl & A Gun)
"Blade Runner" (What So Not Remix)	2010	Religion
"Funky Boogie" (What So Not's 'Hugh Jackman Main Mix')	2011	John Ozila (Pilooski Remix)
"Big Bass Drum" (What So Not Remix)	2011	Tai
"Bust Em Up" (What So Not 'Bass Edition')	2011	Crookers (featuring Savage Skulls)
"Oohnow!" (What So Not Remix)	2011	Tom Piper (featuring Chrome & Stylah)
"Pharaohs" (What So Not 'Club ReRub')	2012	Sbtrkt
"Tek the Money" (What So Not Remix)	2012	Dr Don Don (featuring Lotek)
"Idea of Happiness" (What So Not Remix)	2012	Van She
"Get Free" (What So Not Remix)	2012	Major Lazer (featuring Amber Coffman)
"I Love To Rap" (What So Not Remix)	2012	Peking Duk
"Believer" (What So Not Remix)	2012	Airwolf (featuring Alex Rose)
"Awake Now" (What So Not Remix)	2012	Parachute Youth
"Warrior" (What So Not Remix)	2012	Kimbra (featuring Mark Foster and A-Trak)
"Looking Back" (What So Not Remix)	2013	The Only
"Innerbloom" (What So Not Remix)	2016	Rüfüs
"Redrum" (What So Not Remix)	2017	Era Istrefi (featuring Felix Snow)
"Run" (What So Not and Quix Remix)	2017	Awolnation
"Stranger Things Remix"	2019	What So Not
"14U+14Me" (What So Not and Slumberjack Reset)	2019	The Presets
"Ju$t" (What So Not Remix)	2021	Run the Jewels featuring Pharrell Williams

== Songwriting and production credits ==
Title	Year	Artist(s)	Album	Credits	Written with	Produced with
"Ghost"	2015	Tkay Maidza	Switch Tape	Co-writer/producer	Takudzwa Maidza, Jessica Higgs, Harry Rodrigues	George Maple, Baauer
"Sticks and Horses" (featuring Goldlink)	2016	George Maple	Lover	Producer	-	George Maple, Wills
"Afterglow"	2016	Tkay Maidza	Tkay	Co-writer/producer	Takudzwa Maidza, Jessica Higgs, Andrew Swanson, Natalie Dunn	George Maple, Djemba Djemba
