= Marian Muriel Whiting =

British botanist and plant collector (1881-1978)

Marian Muriel Whiting (1881 – 1978) was a British horticulturalist and plant collector, notable for collecting plants from Hong Kong and Guangzhou. She was born in London and spent a portion of her childhood in Hong Kong before studying at London University. Over 600 of her specimens were donated to the Kew Botanical Gardens. In 1940, she became a Fellow of the Linnean Society of London, and volunteered at Kew for many years. The standard author abbreviation Whiting is used to indicate this person as the author when citing a botanical name.

== Works ==
- Whiting, M. M. (1948). "Early Collection of Plants in Prince Edward Island". Kew Bulletin. 3 (2): 236. doi:10.2307/4119764. JSTOR 4119764.
