= Justice Whiting =

Justice Whiting may refer to:

- Charles S. Whiting (1863–1922), associate justice of the South Dakota Supreme Court
- Henry H. Whiting (1923–2012), associate justice of the Supreme Court of Virginia
- William Austin Whiting (1855–1908), associate justice of the Supreme Court of Hawaii
