= The Society of Arts and Crafts of Boston =

Society of Arts and Crafts
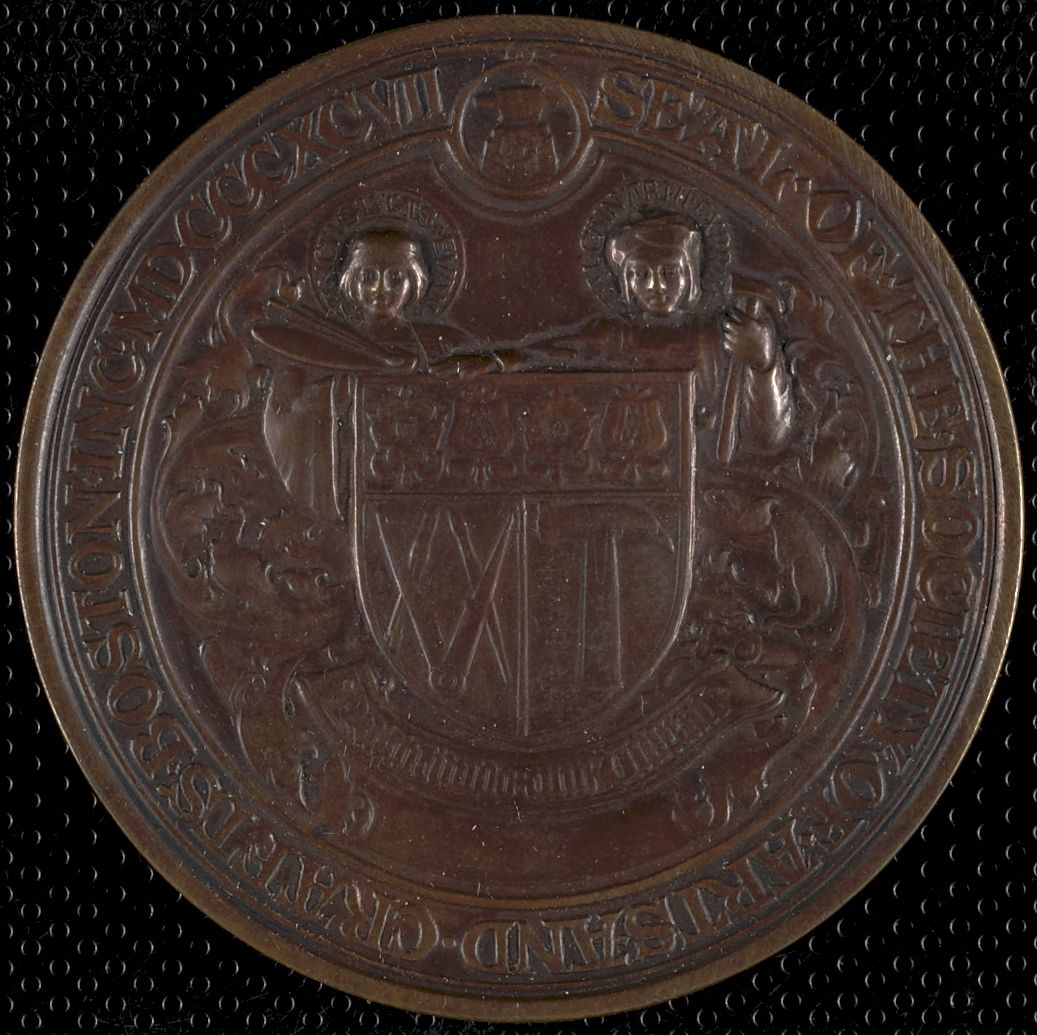
- Formation: 1897
- Location: Boston, Massachusetts
- Website: societyofcrafts.org
- Formerly called: The Society of Arts and Crafts Boston (SACB)

The Society of Arts and Crafts was one of America's oldest arts and craft nonprofit organization. The Society moved to Boston's Seaport District in 2016 after being located on Newbury Street for over 40 years. The Society was incorporated by twenty-one individuals on June 28, 1897, and was then known as the Society of Arts and Crafts in Boston. The small group was representational of Boston's elites in the fields of teaching, art-making, architecture, and craft. The original Society began with the agreement to "develop and encourage higher artistic standards in the handcrafts."

The original building is a stop on the Boston Women's Heritage Trail walking tour.

Frederic Allen Whiting was the Director at the Society until 1912, when Humphery J. Emery took over. He would serve on the board of directors until the 1930s.

== Mission ==
The Society's mission is to support and celebrate craft makers and their creativity. Through its various programs, the organization strives to inspire the creation, assemblage, and promotion of the work of contemporary craft makers. The advancement of public appreciation of fine art has been a lifelong goal of the Society. The Society of Arts + Crafts sponsors exhibitions, the Artist Awards Programs, the John D. Mineck Furniture Fellowship, and educational programming in order to promote the work of contemporary craft artists. Prior to moving fully online in 2020, its retail and exhibition galleries featured nearly four hundred craft artists.

After struggling financially following some relocation issues and pandemic closures, the Society announced it would be closing after 127 years.

== Exhibitions ==
The following is a list of SA+C's exhibitions since 2012.

Exhibition Title	Date	Notes
Executive Order 9066, Wendy Maruyama	September 8 – November 3, 2012	
Our Cups Runneth Over	November 16, 2012– January 19, 2013	Biennial
Contemporary Folk	February 15 – April 13, 2013	
Rethinking Tradition: Portraits in Glass by Joseph Cavalieri	April 26 – July 20, 2013	
Creative Minds, Disciplined Hands: Selections from the New Hampshire Furniture Masters	August 3 – October 19, 2013	
From Minimal to Bling: Contemporary Studio Jewelry	November 1, 2013 – January 11, 2014	Biennial
Floral Fictions: Recent Work by Jessica Calderwood	January 31, 2014 – April 19, 2014	
SAC Artists Awards Exhibition	May 2 – July 19, 2014	
William Daley: 14 for 7	August 2 – October 25, 2014	
Our Cups Runneth Over: Sculptural & Functional Cups	November 8, 2014 – January 10, 2015	Biennial
Collisions & Collaborations: Kathy King, Kevin Snipes and Brian R. Jones	January 30 – April 11, 2015	
Alchimia: An Anthology	May 1 – July 11, 2015	
Stay in Touch: Seven Years of the John D. Mineck Furniture Fellowship	August 1 – October 17, 2015	
From Minimal to Bling: Contemporary Studio Jewelry	November 6, 2015 – January 10, 2016	Biennial
Radius	October – November 2016	Opening exhibition at new Seaport District location
Our Cups Runneth Over	November 2016 – February 2017	Biennial
I.M.A.G.I.N.E. Peace Now	February – June 2017	Traveling show in collaboration with artist Boris Bally
Archipomorphic: Tim Ian Mitchell	February – March 2017	
Artist Awards	June – October 2017	Award recipients: Tanya Crane, Janice Jakielski, Julie Morringello
Fantasy Architectures: Jay Rogers	October 2017 – January 2018	
From Minimal to Bling: Contemporary Studio Jewelry	November 2017 – February 2018	
All Things Considered IX: Basketry in the 21st Century	March – June 2018	Traveling show presented by the National Basketry Organization
The Cover Up: Donna Rhae Marder	May – August 2018	
Infinite Vibration: Niho Kozuru	June – September 2018	
Landscapes, Crafted	August – October 2018	
Elizabeth Cohen: Life Cycle	October 2018	
Adorning Boston + Beyond: Contemporary Studio Jewelry Then + Now	November 8, 2018 – February 17, 2019	In conjunction with the Museum of Fine Arts exhibit Boston Made, guest-curated by Heather White
Our Cups Runneth Over	November 8, 2018 – February 17, 2019	Biennial, guest-curated by Mary Barringer
Rebecca Welz: Inner + Outer Spaces	February 2019 – March 2019	
Pulp + Process	February 21 – April 21, 2019	Curated by Sam Aldrich, 2019 Emerging Curator
Peter T. Bennett: The Lure of Aluminum	March 14 – May 5, 2019	
PRIED	April 25 – June 30, 2019	Guest-curated by Izzy Berdan and Dave J Bermingham, co-founders of the Boston LGBTQIA Artists Alliance
Linda Huey: Dark Garden and other works	May 9 – July 21, 2019	

== Annual events ==
Every year, the Society of Arts + Crafts hosts two promotional events for local and international artists, CraftBoston Spring and CraftBoston Holiday. CraftBoston is a show of contemporary art, craft and design, and is well known for its advancement of both the arts and craftspeople. These events are held at popular venues and convention halls in Boston biannually.

== Publications ==
- Exhibition of the Society of arts & crafts, 1907
