= Waiting (Degas) =

Pastel by Edgar Degas

- Artist: Edgar Degas
- Year: 1880-1882
- Medium: pastel on paper
- Dimensions: 48.2 cm × 61 cm (19.0 in × 24 in)
- Location: Norton Simon Museum at the J. Paul Getty Museum, Los Angeles, Pasadena

Waiting is a pastel on paper by the French Impressionist Edgar Degas, completed between 1880-882. It is an early example of the more than 200 pastels, paintings, mixed media drawings and sculptures of ballerinas depicted by Degas from the early 1880s. This work is regarded for its vibrant colouring and steep perspective.

The ballerina series follows his earlier studies of both lower and middle-class women, where he looked at the moment when they let their public face drop and pretence gave way to an awareness of the reality of both themselves and their surroundings. With ballerinas he was primarily interested in the contrast between their beauty and grace on stage and the reality of the physical and physiological toil such artifice took on the performers. Of the more than 200 works, only 50 show the dancers performing on stage; the rest are set in rehearsals or capture fleeting, private moments like this. Waiting is an empathetic example, depicting a ballerina accompanied by her chaperone, bent over ostensibly to massage her foot but whose body language indicates a person racked with anticipation before she takes stage.

The background is formed from a wide variety of oranges, browns and blacks, while the younger woman is portrayed in pink, blue, and creamy tones, which highlight her softness compared to the severity of the older woman. The work is executed with an innovative mixture of subtle (the woman's feet), slashed (the bench) and hatched (the younger woman's dress) strokes.

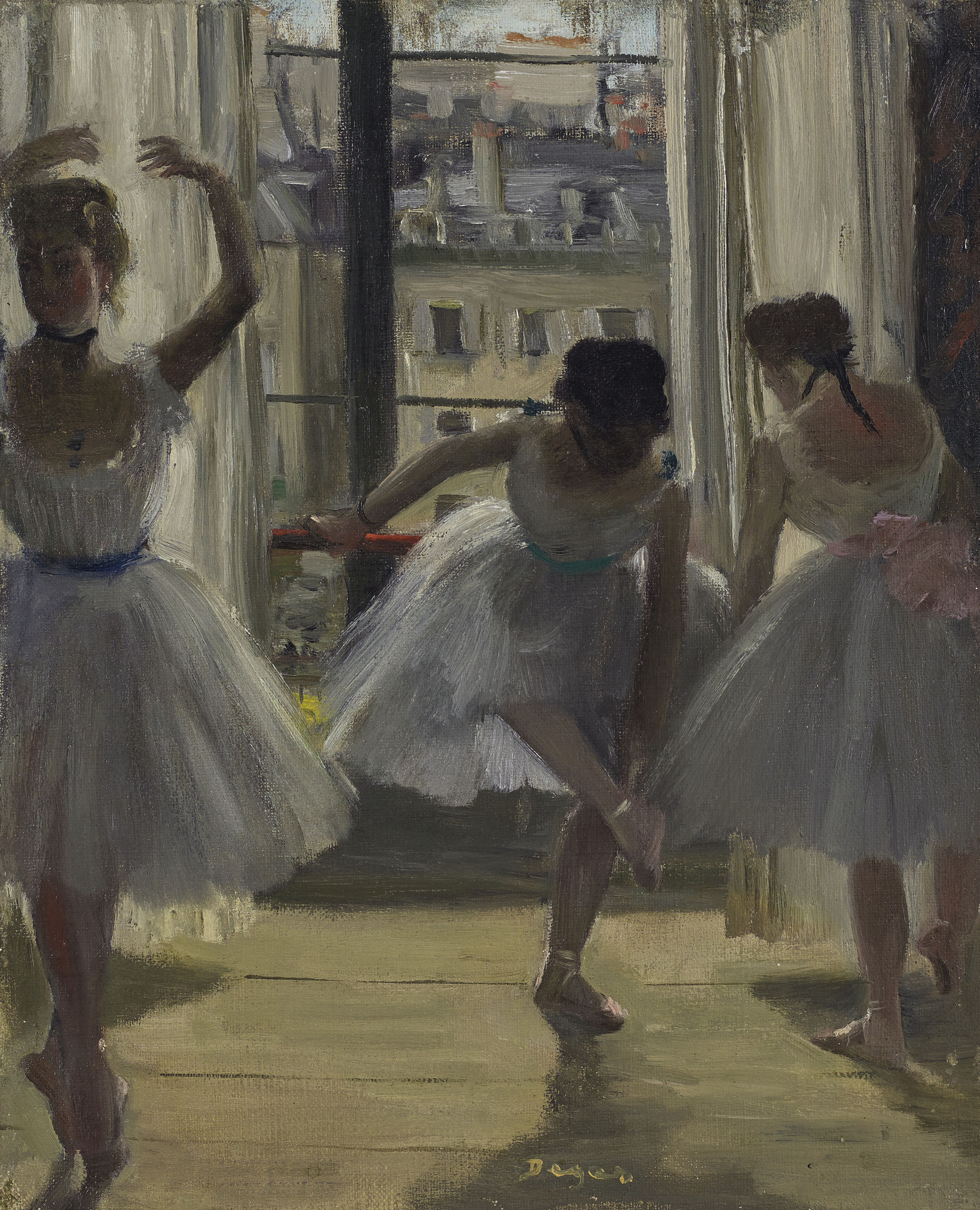
Three Dancers in an Exercise Hall, 1880, Degas, Oil on canvas

Degas was taken by the peripheral world of the dancers, the rehearsals and backstage moments, a world to which he did not have access to until 1885; he only became interested in the ballet in 1870, and backstage was strictly limited to long term patrons. His removal from the moment reflected in the image is highlighted by the unusually steep perspective; the viewer seems to be positioned far above the two women; looking down as if seated in a box above the auditorium.

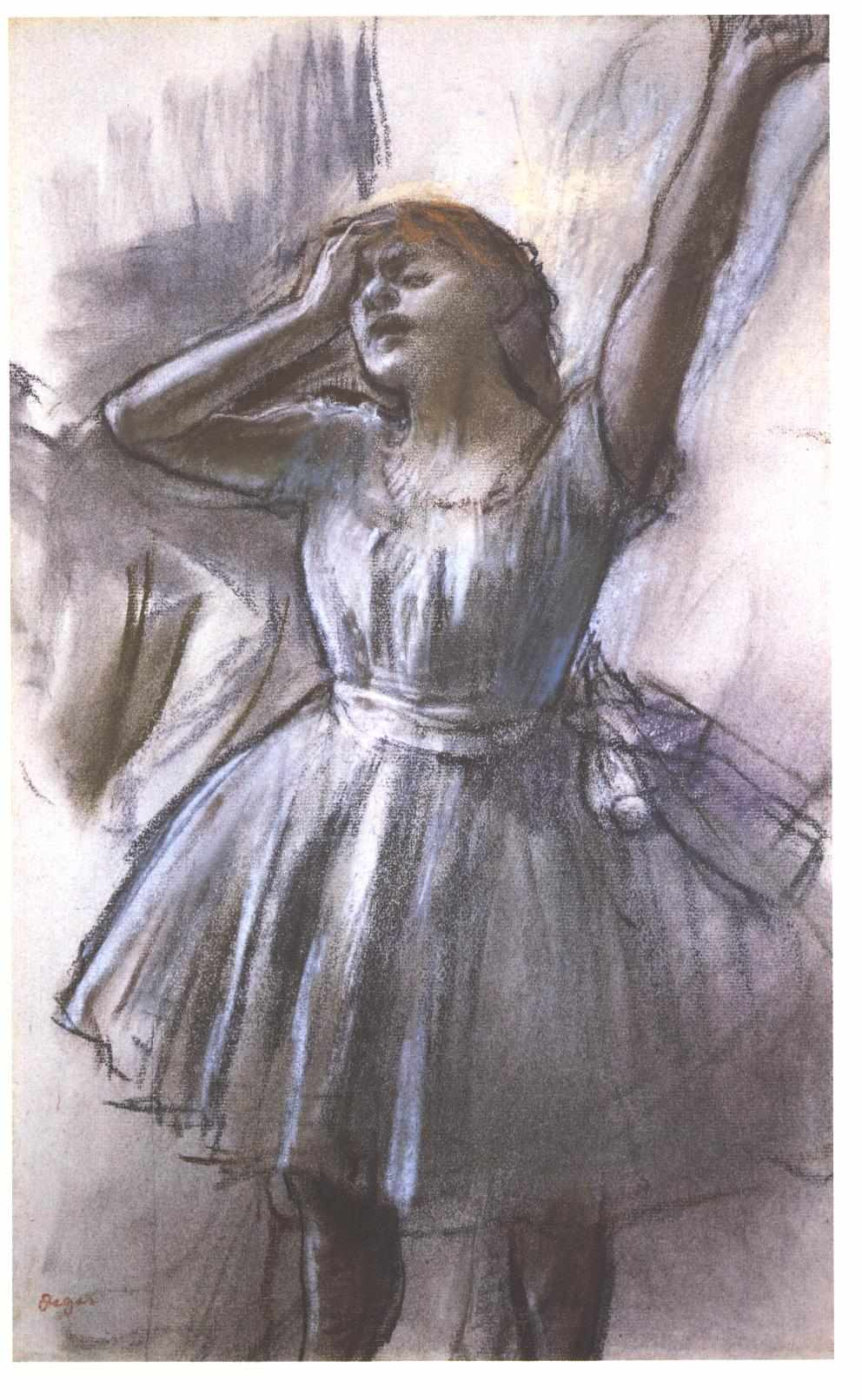
Dancer Stretching, c 1882–1885., Degas, Pastel on paper. 46.7 x 29.7 cm. Kimbell Art Museum, Fort Worth, Texas

Degas was aware from an early point in his studies of the exhaustion of the girls and the extent to which they pushed the limits of their bodies for fleeting moments of elegance. He was further conscious of the brevity of a ballerina's career, and the positioning of the older chaperone–more than likely an ex-dancer herself–in this work adds to its poignancy; the younger woman representing what her forlorn looking companion once was. Degas, mindful of this, presents an interesting irony - while the young woman waits to make her entrance the older woman waits for her to leave. The tip of the chaperone's umbrella points in the direction the dancer must take; towards the stage and away from her guardian.

Describing the dichotomy of the series, Rilke wrote in 1898 of Degas' pictures of "ballerinas full of sequined rubbish and stage lighting. They surprise us with their ugliness, these girls, whose whole life gradually descends into their legs so that on their low, twilight brows nothing remains except a dull memory of things never known, and that will soon be lost in the acquired smile..."

The work is jointly owned by the Norton Simon Art Foundation, Pasadena and the J. Paul Getty Museum, Los Angeles.

== Sources ==
- Hofmann, Werner. Degas: A Dialogue of Difference. London: Thames and Hudson, 2007. ISBN 0-500-09341-5
- Thomson, Richard. Edgar Degas: Waiting (Getty Museum Studies on Art). J. Paul Getty Museum, 1995. ISBN 0-89236-285-5
