= Lilian Whiting =

American journalist

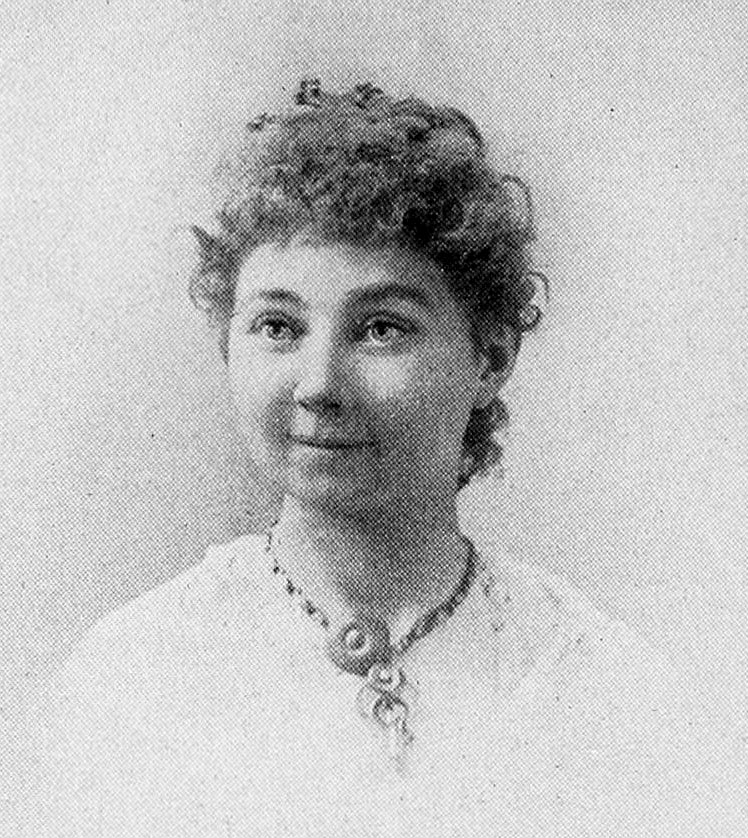
- "A Woman of the Century"
- Born: Emily Lilian Whiting; October 3, 1847; Niagara Falls, New York, U.S.
- Died: April 30, 1942 (aged 94); Boston, Massachusetts, U.S.
- Education: Mount Carroll Seminary
- Occupations: Journalist, author
- Relatives: Lorenzo D. Whiting (father), Cotton Mather
- Writing career
- Language: English
- Genres: poetry, short stories

Lilian Whiting (October 3, 1847 – April 30, 1942) was an American journalist, editor, and author of poetry and short stories. She served as literary editor of the Boston Evening Traveller (1880–1890), editor-in-chief of the Boston Budget (1890–93), and afterward, spent much of her time in Europe. Whiting was the author of The World Beautiful, From Dreamland Sent, a book of poems, A Study of the Life and Poetry of Elizabeth Barrett Browning, A Record of Kate Field, The World Beautiful in Books, Boston Days, Florence of Landor, The Outlook Beautiful, Italy, the Magic Land, Paris the Beautiful, " After Her Death" and others.

== Early years and education ==
Emily Lilian Whiting was born in Niagara Falls, New York (or Olcott, New York), on October 3, 1847, though she often claimed her date of birth as October 3, 1859. Her parents were Illinois State Senator Hon. Lorenzo D. Whiting and Lucretia (née, Clement) Whiting. Her ancestry included Rev. William Whiting, the first Unitarian minister of Concord, Massachusetts, in the early part of the 17th century. Her paternal grandmother was born Mather, and was a direct descendant of Cotton Mather. On her mother's side, her ancestry was also from New England, largely of the Episcopal clergy. While Whiting was an infant, the parents removed to Illinois. For some time, the parents served as principals of the public schools in Tiskilwa, Illinois, a village near their farm. Subsequently, the father became the editor of the Bureau County Republican, published in Princeton, Illinois. In that work, he was assisted by his wife. Later, he was elected to the Illinois General Assembly as representative from his district, and, after some years in the lower house, was elected State senator, in which capacity he served for 18 consecutive years. He was one of the framers of the constitution of Illinois. Little was left to the children after the death of Senator Whiting, in 1889. The mother died in 1875.

Whiting, the only daughter, was educated largely under private tuition and by her parents. She attended the Mount Carroll Seminary (later known as Shimer College) in Illinois. Books and periodicals abounded in the family home with the best literature of the world available to her. She inherited from her mother much of the temperament of the mystic and the visionary, and her bent was always toward books and the world of thought.

== Career ==
Whiting went to St. Louis, Missouri, in 1876, to pursue a career in journalism, remaining there for three years. In the spring of 1879, through the acceptance of two papers on Margaret Fuller, Murat Halstead gave Whiting a place on his paper, the Cincinnati Commercial. After a year in Cincinnati, she went, in the summer of 1880, to Boston, Massachusetts, where she soon began to work for the Boston Evening Traveller as an art writer. To her writing on the art exhibitions and studio work in Boston and New York City, she added various miscellaneous contributions. In 1885, she was made the literary editor of the Traveller. In 1890, she resigned from her place on the Traveller, and, three days after, she became the editor-in-chief of the Boston Budget. In that paper, she did the editorial writing, the literary reviews, and a "Beau Monde" column.

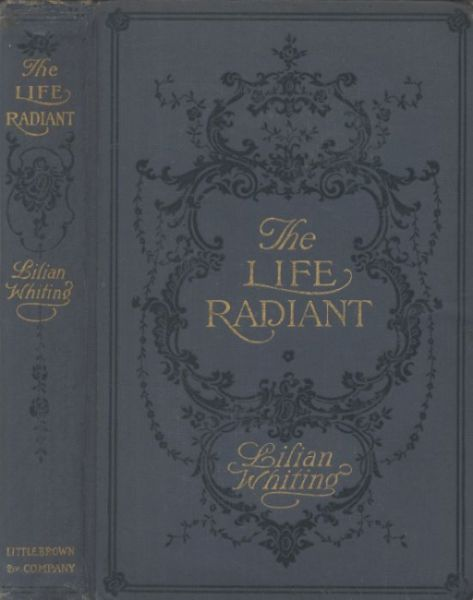
Cover of The Life Radiant by Lilian Whiting

Whiting passed part of 1896 to 1900 in Europe, principally in Paris, Rome, Florence, and London, and again part of 1903, 1905, 1906–7. She was the author of The World Beautiful, 3 volumes, 1st, 2d, and 3d series; From Dreamland Sent (poems); After Her Death; The Story of a Summer; A Study of the Life and Poetry of Elizabeth Barrett Browning; Kate Field—a Record; The Spiritual Significance, 1900; The World Beautiful in Books, 1901; Boston Days, 1902; The Life Radiant, 1903; The Florence of Landor, 1900; The Outlook Beautiful, 1905; The Joy that no Man taketh from You, 1905; The Land of Enchantment, 1906; From Dream to Vision of Life, 1906; Italy, the Magic Land, 1907.

== Personal life ==
For several years, she lived in the Brunswick Hotel in Boston. She was interested in the Baháʼí Faith and Theosophy. Whiting died at the Copley Plaza Hotel in Boston on April 30, 1942.

== Selected works ==
- The World Beautiful (three series, 1894, 1896, 1898)
- A Study of the Life and Character of Elizabeth Barrett Browning (1899)
- From Dream-Land Sent (1899)
- Kate Field: a Record (1899)
- The World Beautiful in Books (1901)
- Boston Days (1902)
- The Life Radiant (1903)
- The Florence of Landor (1905)
- The Outlook Beautiful (1905)
- Land of Enchantment (1906)
- Italy: The Magic Land (1907)
- Paris, the Beautiful (1908)
- Louise Chandler Moulton: Poet and Friend (1909)
- Life Transfigured (1910)
- The Brownings (1911)
- Athens (1913)
- The Lure of London (1914)
- Women Who Have Ennobled Life (1915)
- Canada the Spellbinder (1917)
- The Golden Road (1918)
