= Waiting =

Waiting, Waitin, Waitin', or The Waiting may refer to:

== Art ==
- Waiting (Degas), a c. 1880–1882 pastel on paper by Edgar Degas
- Waiting (Millais), an 1854 painting by John Everett Millais

== Film ==
- Waiting (1991 film), a film by Jackie McKimmie
- Waiting... (film), a 2005 film starring Ryan Reynolds
- Waiting, a 2007 film by Zarina Bhimji
- Waiting (2015 film), an Indian drama film starring Naseeruddin Shah and Kalki Koechlin
- The Waiting (film), a 2020 American horror/romance/comedy by F. C. Rabbath
- The Good Neighbor (2016 film) (working title The Waiting), an American thriller film

== Literature ==
- Waiting (novel), a 1999 novel by Ha Jin
- Waiting (picture book), a 2015 children's book by Kevin Henkes
- The Waiting (graphic novel), a 2020 graphic novel by Keum Suk Gendry-Kim
- "The Waiting" (short story), or "The Wait", a 1950 story by Jorge Luis Borges
- The Waiting, a 2024 novel by Michael Connelly

== Music ==
- The Waiting (band), a Christian pop rock band
- Waiting (KLF film), a video by The KLF

=== Albums ===
- Waiting (Bobby Hutcherson album) (1976)
- Waiting (Fun Boy Three album) (1983)
- Waiting (Thursday album) (1999)
- Waiting... (EP), am EP by The Rockfords
- The Waiting (album), an album by Royal Wood
- Waiting, an album by Graham Ord
- The Waiting, an album by Peter Buffett

=== Songs ===
- "Waiting" (Green Day song), 2001
- "Waiting" (Kian song), 2018
- "Waiting" (Porcupine Tree song), 1996
- "Waiting..." (City and Colour song), 2008
- "The Waiting" (song), by Tom Petty and the Heartbreakers, 1981
- "Waiting", by 311 from Don't Tread on Me
- "Waiting", by Au5 and Crystal Skies from Bridges Between
- "Waiting", by the Cat Empire from Cinema
- "Waiting", by Cheryl Cole from Messy Little Raindrops
- "Waiting", by Chris Isaak from San Francisco Days
- "Waiting", by Dwight Yoakam featuring Deana Carter from Dwight's Used Records
- "Waiting", by Fireflight from The Healing of Harms
- "Waiting", by Girls Aloud from Chemistry
- "Waiting", by Jay Sean from My Own Way
- "Waiting", by Joe Satriani from Shapeshifting
- "Waiting", by Joy and the Boy from Paradise
- "Waiting", by Lala Karmela
- "Waiting", by Madonna from Erotica
- "Waiting", by Miz from Story Untold
- "Waiting", by Pennywise from From the Ashes
- "Waiting", by the Red Jumpsuit Apparatus from Don't You Fake It
- "Waiting", by the Rentals from Return of the Rentals
- "Waiting", by Ringo Starr from Beaucoups of Blues
- "Waiting", by RL Grime, Skrillex and What So Not
- "Waiting", by Santana from Santana
- "Waiting", by Shiny Toy Guns from We Are Pilots
- "Waiting", by the Suburbs from Dream Hog EP
- "Waiting", by Trapt from Someone in Control
- "Waiting", by Ultravox, the B-side of the single "Sleepwalk"
- "Waiting", by White Town from Socialism, Sexism & Sexuality
- "Waiting", by Zhavia Ward
- "Waiting", from the musical Marguerite
- "Waiting", from the musical The Addams Family
- "Waiting", by Xentrix from Kin
- "Waiting (Reprise)", by George Michael from Listen Without Prejudice Vol. 1

== Other uses ==
- "Waiting" (SpongeBob SquarePants), a 2007 television episode
- Waiting staff, work as a waiter or waitress

== See also ==
- Patience
- Waiting period
- Pause (disambiguation)
- Still Waiting (disambiguation)
- Wait (disambiguation)
