= Whiting Homestead =

Historic house in Connecticut, United States

- U.S. National Register of Historic Places
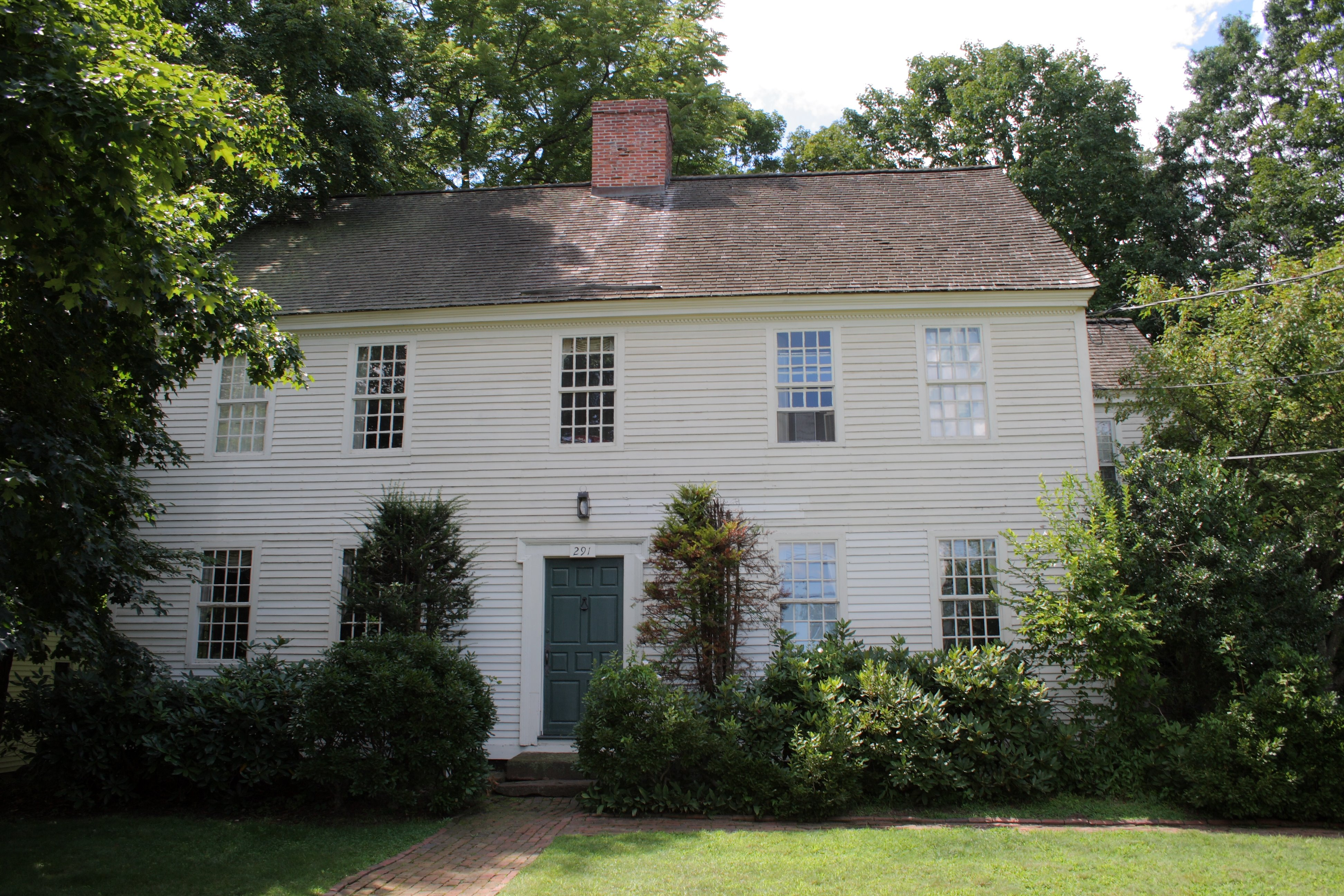

- Location within Connecticut Location within the United States
- Location: 291 North Main Street, West Hartford, Connecticut
- Coordinates: 41°46′50″N 72°44′50″W
- Area: 0.5 acres (0.20 ha)
- Built: 1790
- Architectural style: Colonial
- MPS: Eighteenth-Century Houses of West Hartford TR (AD)
- NRHP reference No.: 87001291
- Added to NRHP: August 3, 1987

The Whiting Homestead is a historic house at 291 North Main Street in West Hartford, Connecticut. Built about 1790, it is a fine example of late colonial architecture, with many original interior features. The house was listed on the National Register of Historic Places on August 3, 1987.

== Description and history ==
The Whiting Homestead is located north of the center of West Hartford, on the west side of North Main Street at its junction with Lawler Street. It is a 2 1/2-story wood-frame structure, five bays wide, with a large central chimney, and a center entrance. The main entrance is framed by a molded architrave with ears, and the cornice at the roofline is dentillated. A 20th-century addition projects from the main block's northwest corner. The interior follows a typical center chimney plan, with a narrow entrance vestibule that also has a tight winding staircase. The left parlor has original paneling on the walls and doors, while the right parlor features a fine Federal style fireplace surround. Original doors are mounted on strap hinges.

Land on which the house built was first partitioned in 1679, and was assigned to Joseph Haynes, son of John Haynes, an early Connecticut governor. The house was probably built c. 1790 by Gurdon Saltonstall Whiting, a Haynes descendant, and is one West Hartford's few surviving 18th-century houses. It is particularly notable for its largely intact and extensive interior wood paneling. The house remained in the hands of Whiting's descendants until 1920, when it was sold to the Lawler family.

== See also ==
- National Register of Historic Places listings in West Hartford, Connecticut
