= Frederic Allen Whiting =

Philanthropist and museum director

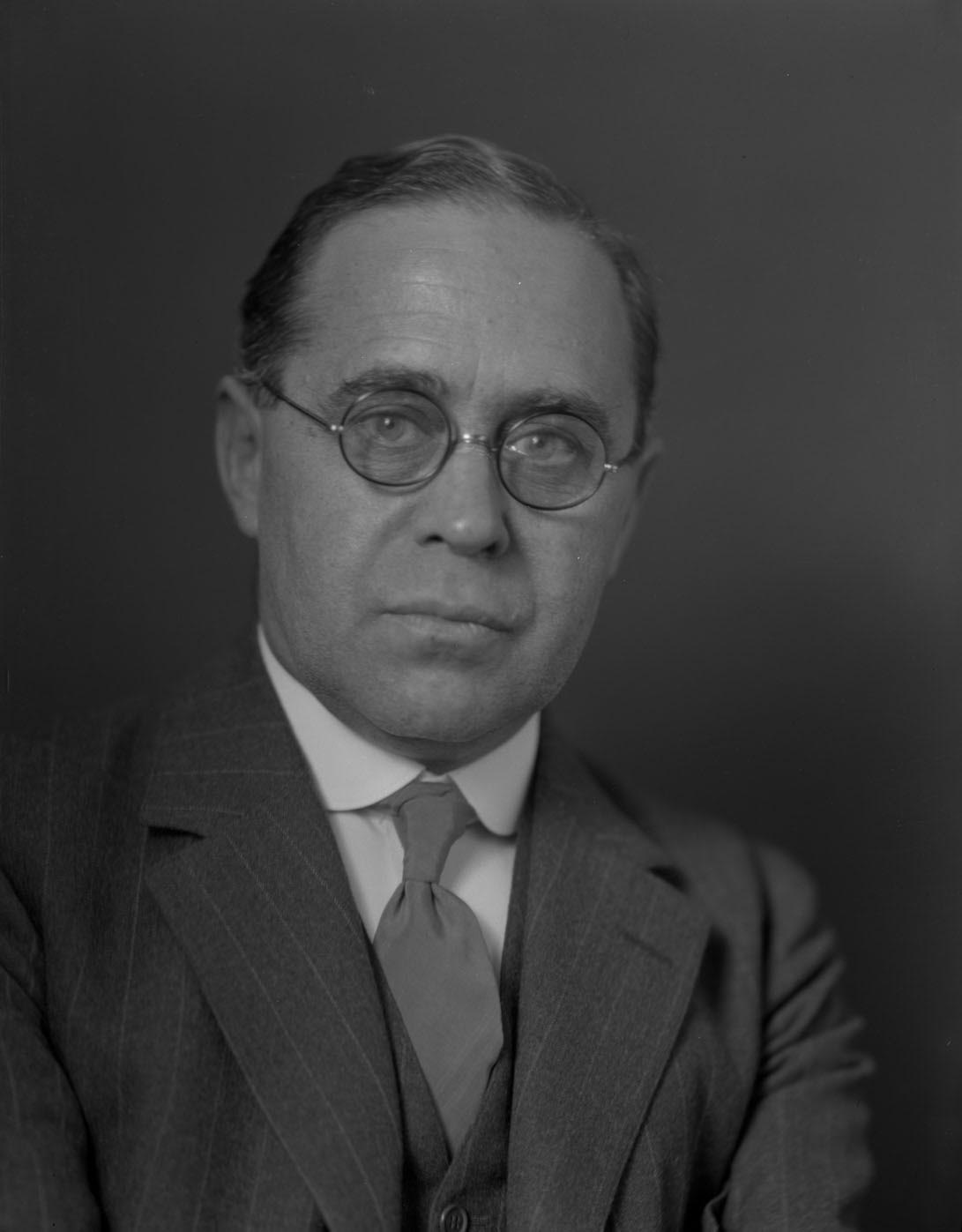
- Born: Frederic Allen Whiting; January 26, 1873; Oakdale, Tennessee
- Died: 1959 (aged 85–86); Framingham, Massachusetts
- Employer(s): Indianapolis Museum of Art, Cleveland Museum of Art, American Federation of Arts
- Known for: Director of Cleveland Museum of Art, 1913–30
- Spouse(s): Olive Elizabeth Cook (1872–1954), married in 1903

Frederic Allen Whiting (1873–1959) was a philanthropist and museum director. Whiting acted as an advocate for education and pioneer for public outreach, and was known for his prolific career in the museum world, most notably as the founding director of the Cleveland Museum of Art (1913–30) and later the president of the American Federation of Arts (1930–36).

== Early life ==
On January 26, 1873, Frederic Allen Whiting was born in Oakdale, Tennessee to Frederic and Catherine Allen Whiting. The Whiting family originally hailed from Massachusetts, but the patriarch's work as the president of an iron company led the Whitings first to Tennessee and, later, to New Jersey, throughout the young Whiting's childhood. Apart from a few years in grammar school, Whiting had no formal education; he received his schooling primarily through tutoring at home.

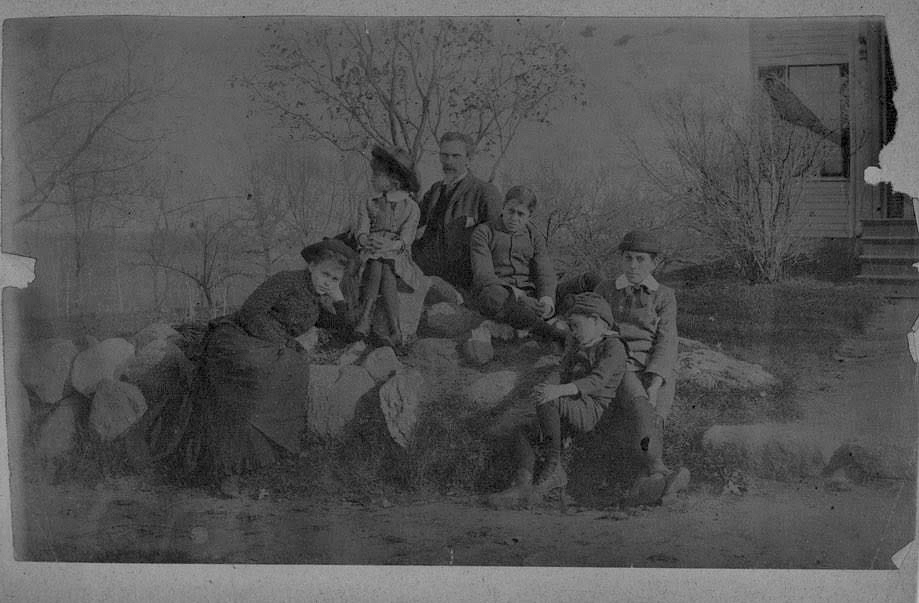
Whiting Family Portrait

When Whiting was seventeen, the Whiting family moved to Lowell, Massachusetts, a town primarily fueled by its industry in textile manufacturing. Active in both his local church and community, Whiting initially planned to enter the ministry. Ultimately, however, his poor eyesight dissuaded him from pursuing this career. Soon after, Whiting entered into business, following the lead of his father and brothers. Although the Whitings remained in Lowell for just five years before moving closer to Boston in 1895, the blue-collar mill town had a lasting impact on Whiting, who remained there until 1897. The textile mills in Lowell attracted both migrant workers and European immigrants who were largely exploited as unskilled laborers. Whiting's early exposure to the harsh realities of industrial America developed his strong sense of civic duty and commitment to education. Demonstrating an early interest in community service, he began serving as treasurer of a charitable organization connected to his church, the Unity Congregational Church of Lowell. Whiting would later comment, "I think the most important factor was the social work in the mill town of Lowell, where I…spent a good deal of time in club work with mill boys." His charitable work in Lowell continued to influence his conception of community and commitment to service throughout his life. Furthermore, these principles informed his later beliefs about the role that museums should play in their local communities, as evidenced by his tenure at The Cleveland Museum of Art.

== Career ==
=== Arts and Crafts Movement ===
Whiting's passions for education and art, namely the Arts and Crafts and handiwork, came together while he worked to establish himself as a leader in the arts community. With a career that started in business, he made an early transition into the world of art after meeting C. Howard Walker (1857–1936) of The Society of Arts and Crafts of Boston on a ship bound for England in 1898. A friendship was struck, and two years later Walker offered Whiting the paid position as secretary to the Society of Arts and Crafts, Boston. The society was an outgrowth of European societies much like the one founded by William Morris to encourage craftsmanship despite the industrial age. Whiting remained in this position for 12 years, establishing himself as a national advocate for industrial and decorative art objects, craftworks, and public education.

Whiting's personal interest in handiwork was prioritized in both of his professional careers in arts institutions and in his personal life as well. Whiting organized the literary journal Handicraft, published for the first time by The Society of Arts and Crafts, Boston in 1902. He served as the original editor for the publication, which had a clear focus on educating its audience and connecting its community by distributing essays by artists and craftsmen, advertising craft shows, and listing local lecture and demonstration opportunities.

Whiting also founded the National League of Handicraft Societies in 1907.

=== Indianapolis Museum of Art ===
Following his resignation as secretary of the Society of Arts and Crafts, Boston, Whiting officially entered the museum profession in 1912, when he accepted a position as Director of the John Herron Art Institute in Indianapolis (later known as the Indianapolis Museum of Art). By this time, he was well known within the American arts community as a vocal supporter of the Arts and Crafts movement. Although Whiting remained in Indianapolis for less than one year, many of his efforts here prefigured the innovative programs he would later institute at the Cleveland Museum of Art, including establishing a training program for museum docents and gearing public education at younger audiences. Whiting was recommended to be Director of the Cleveland Museum of Art, through a personal connection, Lockwood de Forest, brother to the Metropolitan Museum of Art's president, Robert W. DeForest.

=== Cleveland Museum of Art ===
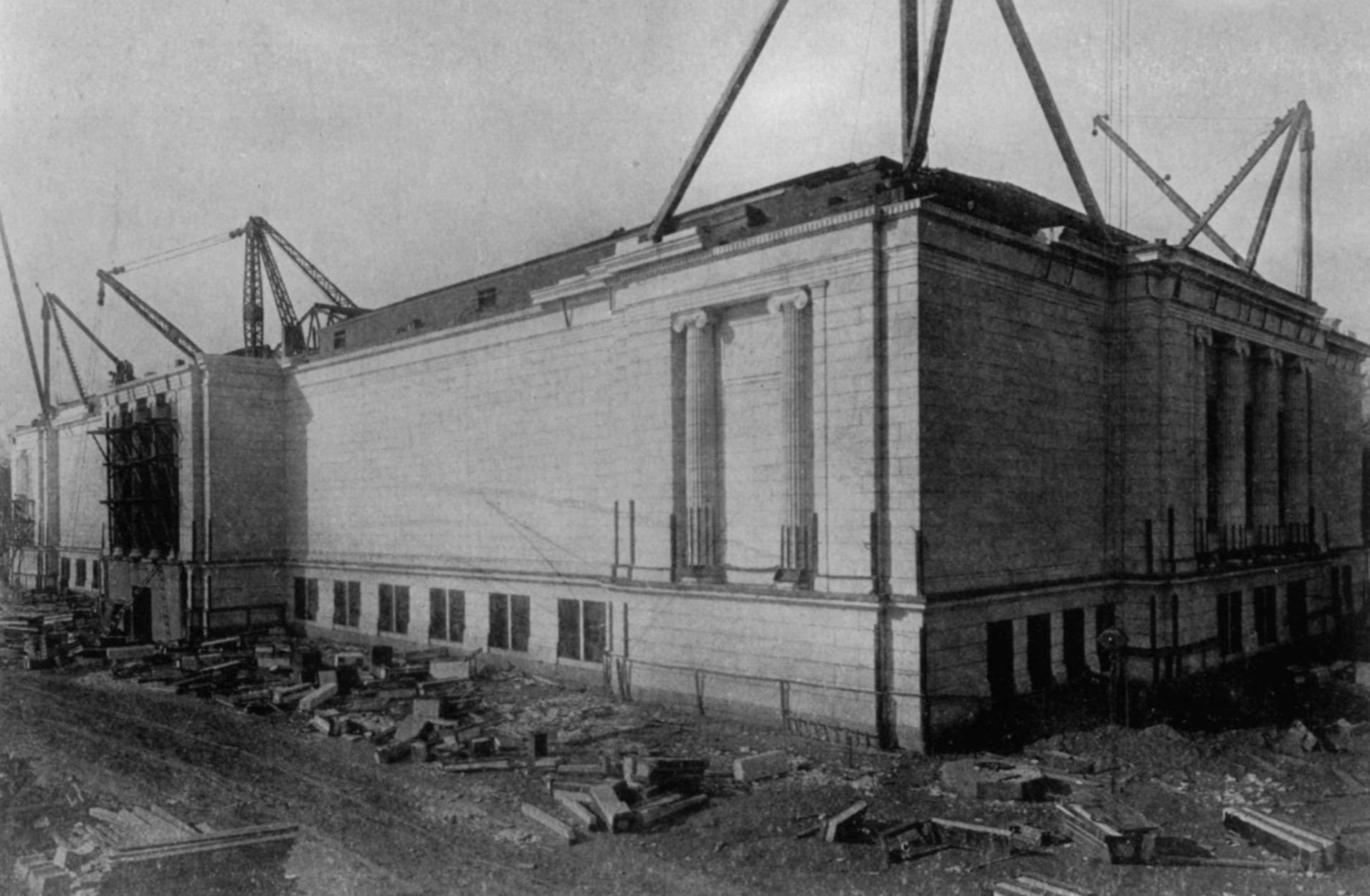
Cleveland Museum of Art under construction

The earliest years of the Cleveland Museum of Art (known colloquially as "CMA") involved a very intimate group of people, mostly executors named by the wills of Horace Kelley and John Huntington. Having garnered both favor and respect among his colleagues while serving as Secretary of the Society of Arts and Crafts, Boston and as Director in Indianapolis, Whiting was positioned as a leading candidate for the directorship of the newly established Cleveland Museum of Art. At a meeting on December 15, 1913, after serving only a few short months as the president of the board of trustees to the CMA, the board hired its first salaried staff member, unanimously appointing Whiting as the museum's first director. With Whiting's position secured, the museum could solidify its goals and mission. Twelve members of the Board of Trustees were acknowledged in the first museum bulletin, issued in April 1914. By July of the same year, this number had already begun to swell in order to accommodate the rapidly growing project.

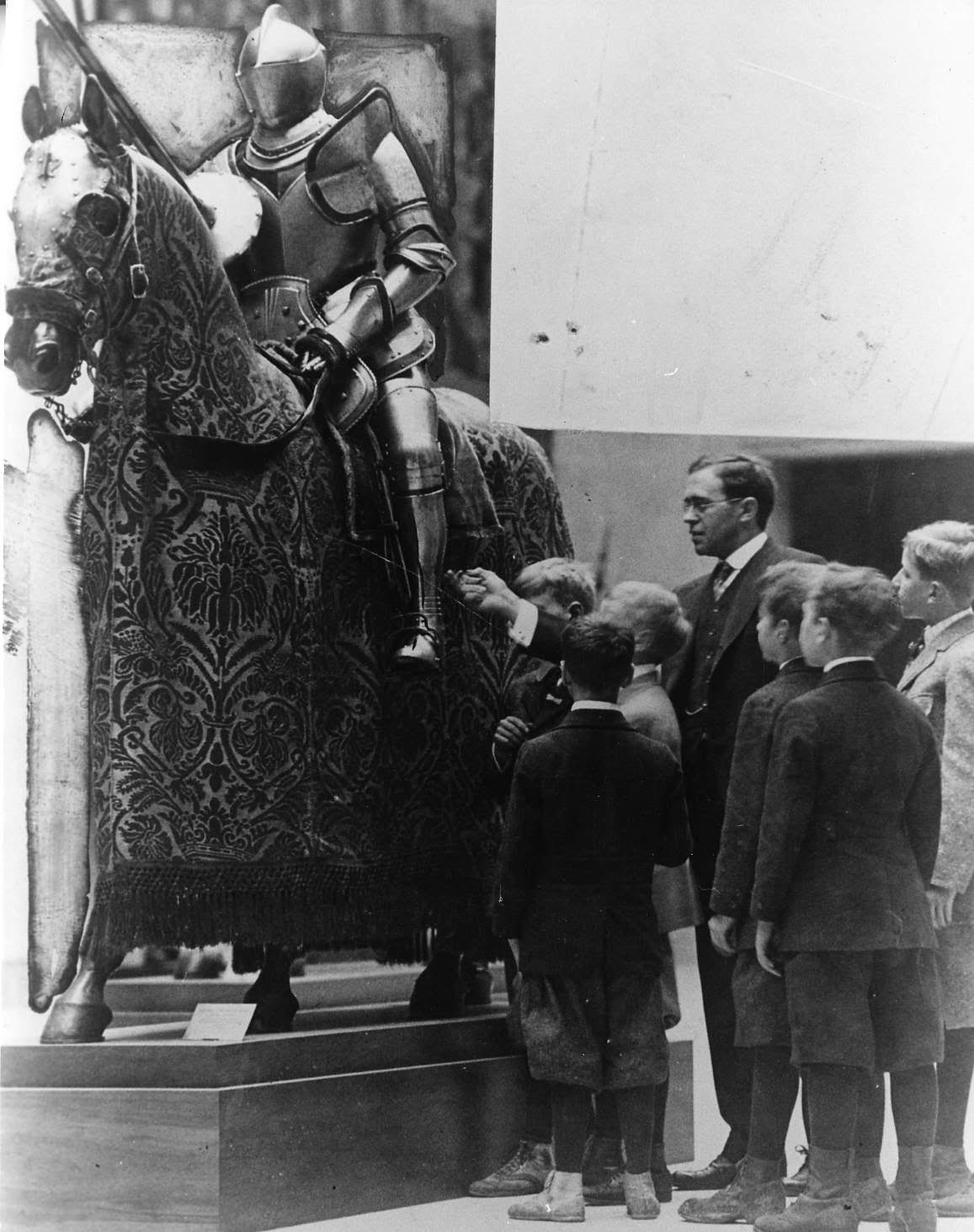
Frederic Allen Whiting opening of the Cleveland Museum of Art

Whiting's plans for the Cleveland Museum of Art centered on his life's mission: education. The collection that developed in the earliest stages of the CMA's founding included art that was considered to be accessible, relevant, and useful to its community. According to Whiting, "Cleveland was an industrial town … [the museum] should at least reflect that if not somehow promote it." Its purpose, in the words of the first director, "called for immediate, concrete objects." Reflecting later on these early decisions in collecting and public programing, in an address to the Cleveland Conference for Educational Cooperation on April 20, 1925, Whiting explained how he believed such objects could benefit communities not only in Cleveland, but across the globe:

In considering what meaning should be given to the term "education" [we look] at the question from the standpoint of the interest of the community as a whole. It is of vital importance to the community that the members of emerging generations should be properly oriented with respect to the society of which they become a part, with respect to the natural environment in which they find themselves, with respect to themselves, their abilities and needs. It is important that these individuals be qualified for productive life. It is important that they should be enabled to draw personal joy and satisfaction from the wealth of experience which the life of the community affords. And finally, it is important that the individual as a result of his educational experience shall consciously contribute to the general welfare and betterment of his community.

While covering geographically diverse regions, Whiting managed to comprise a museum of mostly objects. In fact, he specifically sought "objects of domestic use," as they were materials that the Cleveland people could relate to and appreciate. The 1916 inaugural collection had hundreds of vases, bowls, plates, pottery, and other objects which, during this period, were not traditionally found in major museums. Their similarities provided a constant variable that allowed for daily-life comparisons, while their differences in design intrigued the museum goers. It is possible that Whiting sought to acquire such artifacts as he probably saw the obvious element of the handicraft in them. In many ways, the handcrafted vases of antiquity were much like the handmade goods produced in the Arts and Crafts movement.

Further insisting on the relevance of the museum to the local community, Whiting also took part in establishing the annual Cleveland May Show for craftsmen and women. In 1914, he brought his idea to the CMA Board of Trustees, recommending the creation of "an annual exhibition of Ohio born or trained artists, to be managed by a jury and hanging committee chosen by the exhibiting artists." While the museum was initially hesitant to assume responsibility for the time and expenses involved with organizing a local arts show, Whiting convinced the Cleveland Art Association to include works by local Cleveland artists in their Fifth Spring Exhibition, and it was agreed that the event would be hosted by the Cleveland Museum of Art. Impressed with the event's success, the CMA took over the project in 1919 and organized the First Annual Exhibition of Artists, later referred to as "The May Show." The May Show continued to be a Cleveland tradition until 1993.

During his seventeen-year tenure as Director of the CMA, Whiting established an object-based collection of fine art and artifacts, as well as decorative and industrial arts that directly related to the Cleveland community. He pioneered the CMA's early collections policies, and encouraged the museum to further its collections in Egyptian and Asian art after receiving substantial donations of each in 1914. Whiting oversaw the original construction of the CMA, ensuring that a state-of-the-art facility would house the museum's already growing collections, anticipating concerns for preservation and conservation throughout the building process. He built the museum's framework for staff and volunteer employees, hiring the first curator, registrar, education specialist, superintendent of building and grounds, registrar, and librarian. Additionally, Whiting hired a staff of professional docents to provide tours to visitors, and was the first museum director in the US to allow visitors to draw among the artworks in the galleries. He experimented with new display techniques and educational programming, allowing the whole second floor of the museum to be dedicated to galleries for children.

To Whiting's dismay, the CMA Board of Trustees chose to broaden the focus of the museum in order to include the accession of master artworks to become competitive with institutions such as the Metropolitan Museum of Art in New York and the Museum of Fine Arts, Boston. When offered the position as president of the American Federation of Arts in 1930, he decided to pursue his commitment to education there.

=== American Federation of Arts ===
Whiting resigned from his position at the Cleveland Museum of Art in 1930 to become the president of the American Federation of Arts in Washington, DC. Unfortunately, the experience for Whiting was not a good one. In addition, financial problems arose for the organization which ultimately catalyzed his decision to leave. He retired from the AFA in 1936 at the age of 63. In a letter to Harold Clark, he said of the experience:

The fact is, Harold, that something very essential to my success in any undertaking died out of me during the disappointing struggle against an uncooperative board in Washington. My enthusiasm and confidence in the value of the work I was doing was an essential part of my success and this was slowly drained out of me.

Regardless, in his six years of employment at the AFA, there was a shift in focus as Whiting brought his educational priorities to the institution. He set forth a number of initiatives regarding this topic. Under his wing, the AFA began to publish reference and teaching guides, student workbooks, slides, and films that were distributed to educational programs across the country. Whiting's overall international footprint was established through his collaborative initiatives with the Met to "organize circulating exhibitions and to 'bring them to the people.'" Finally his work could be directly appreciated by an international crowd.

== Retirement ==
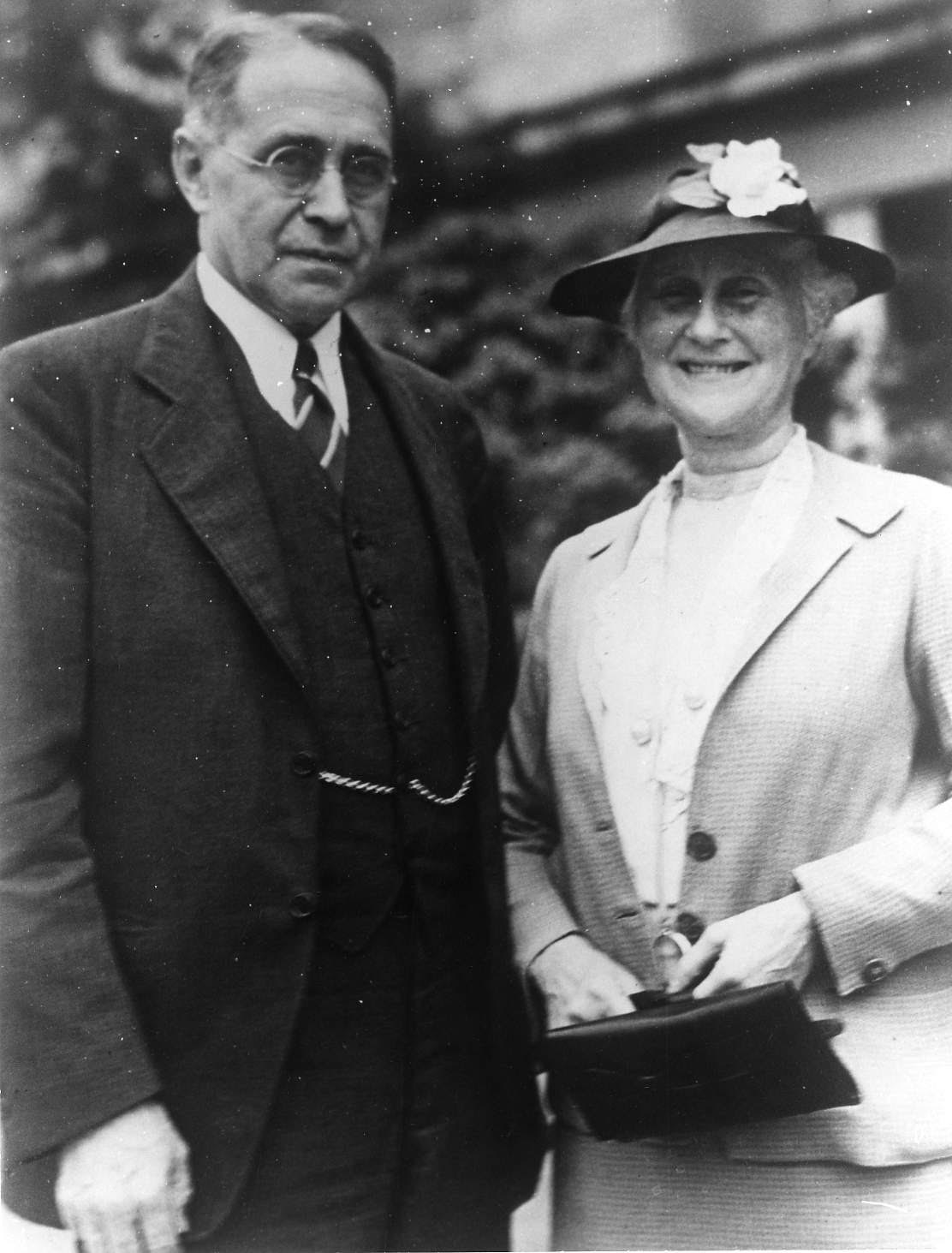
Frederic and Olive Whiting

Whether it was the slow pace of retirement or its financial limitations that ultimately drew Whiting back to the museum field, a few years after his initial retirement, he began searching for opportunities in the museum field. Despite his efforts, he was not successful in regaining the career he had given up.

Undeterred, Whiting entertained the idea of establishing a handicraft shop for local artisans' handicrafts in Maine, but ultimately, this idea never came to fruition. He was, however, able to help found two museums in Orlando, and one in Ogunquit. His past commitments to education and serving the community were exercised in the development of these museums. About the Orlando effort he wrote: "It is an expansion of the plan I worked out with Miss Eastman for the use of distant branch libraries as local cultural centers."

== Legacy ==
Under Whiting's leadership, the Cleveland Museum of art spearheaded innovations in collections policies, display technology, conservation, education and outreach programs, and interdisciplinary collaboration. In many ways, Whiting played an important role in setting the standards for what many twenty-first century Americans now hold in regard to their experiences at an art museum. In its earliest days, the astounding relationship between the CMA and the Cleveland community gave cause for other well-established museums to stop and take recognition. Even if only for a while, museums were looking to the Cleveland Museum of Art as a model of success.

Whiting's public outreach programming helped to establish the principle functions of early American museums as both educational and aesthetic institutions. He was a driving force behind the early twentieth-century push to decentralize the museum as a mundane repository for valuable objects. His conviction of art's primarily educational function, paired with his empathetic approach in relating the museum's collection to the Cleveland public, made art both physically and rationally more accessible to the Cleveland audience with unprecedented success.

The academic value of museums was further ingrained when, under Whiting's leadership, the Cleveland Museum of Art pioneered and implemented a systematic evaluation of their educational programming, demonstrating an active interest in both public education and the efficacy of the museum's role for visitors.

Whiting established a clear place for the celebration of handcrafted materials in museum collections, and in turn, secured their position within the greater hierarchy of art and artifacts. He has left it to modern scholars, however, to establish the distinction between the two (where Whiting ultimately saw none), and to determine and interpret their value in today's world. His acute understanding of art, artists, and their respective positions within the larger context of cultural studies contributed to the conception and development of a state-of-the-art cultural center in which universities, museums, schools of music and design, and other institutions could initiate collaborative and cooperative projects for public education. This project was realized by what is now Cleveland's University Circle.

=== Celebrity ===
Whiting's celebrity status is documented in newspapers from the time, glorifying even the way he wore his glasses. Raymond O'Neil wrote of him: "No man who has come to Cleveland in recent years had been half so expert in wearing glasses as Mr. Whiting is." Less superficially, the same article went on to "compliment" him, saying: "to Allen Whiting's gray eyes there is a calmness that is almost Egyptian." A strange comment to make, however, it does provide the reader with perhaps a bit of surprising information regarding Whiting's disposition.

It seems no wonder that some in Cleveland consider Whiting to be a founding father. The ultimate success of Whiting's career resounds in the fact that nearly every institution and publication he originally shaped exists and thrives in some capacity to this day. Though he left Cleveland in 1930, the city harbored no ill will. The Cleveland Museum of Art had been established and would continue to flourish, thanks to the solid foundation he had laid. Whiting's departure for the AFA was simply the 'next step' in his journey to bring to the nation what he had already brought to Cleveland: a solid arts institution that prioritized education initiatives.

=== Personal life ===
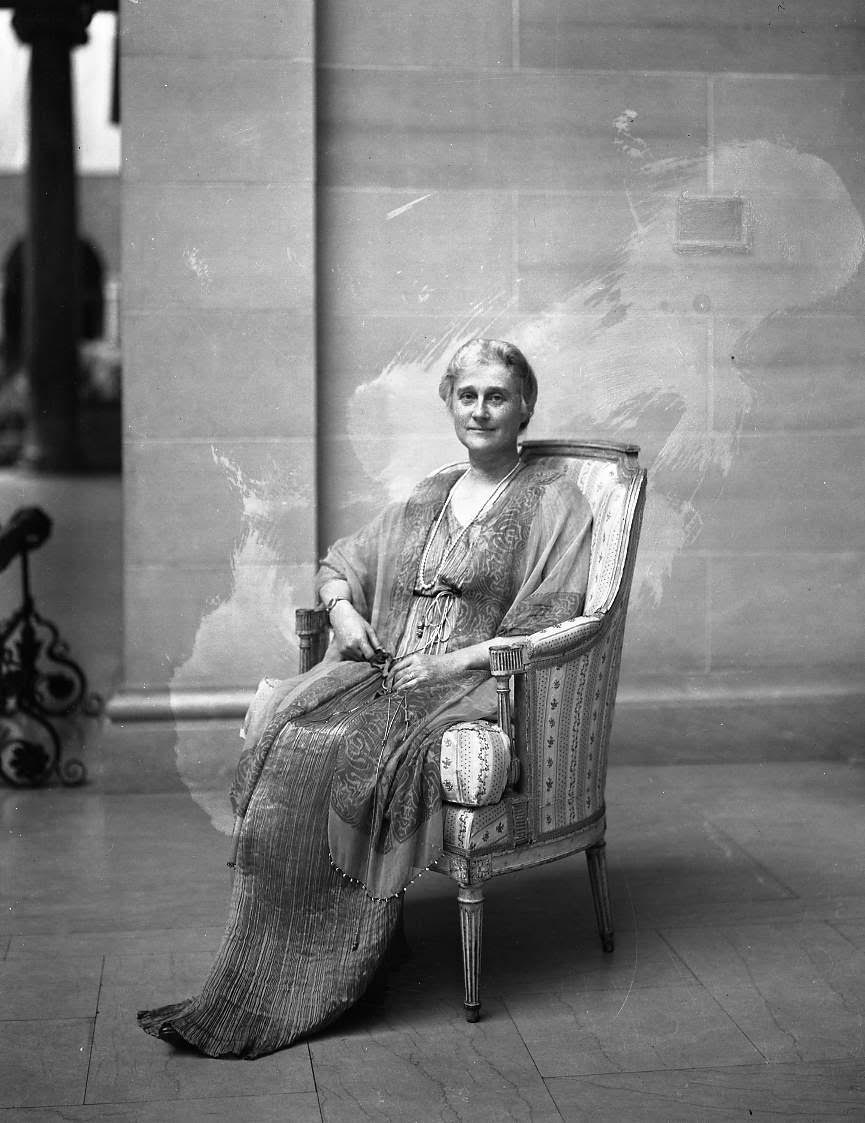
Olive Elizabeth Cook Whiting

Whiting married Olive Elizabeth Cook (1872–1954), a singer from Boston, Massachusetts, on June 4, 1903. The two were appointed to organize the Division of Applied Arts at the Louisiana Purchase Exhibition of 1904 in St. Louis, and were awarded a gold medal for their participation. Frederic and Olive had one son together, Frederic Allen Whiting Jr., in 1906. When the family moved to Cleveland in 1913, Mrs. Whiting maintained a prominent role in the Cleveland Museum's social activities, and maintained the role of Assistant to the Director for some time. Upon retirement, the couple spent their time between homes in Ogunquit, Maine, and Mount Dora, Florida. Olive died in Ogunquit in 1954, and Frederic died five years later, in 1959, in Framingham, Massachusetts.
