= Whitting =

Whitting as a surname may refer to:

- Caroline Whitting (c.1834–?), New Zealand murderer
- Edward Whitting (1872–1938), English cricketer
- Todd Whitting (born 1972), American college baseball coach and former player

== See also ==
- Whiting (surname)
