= Tiskilwa, Illinois =

- Village
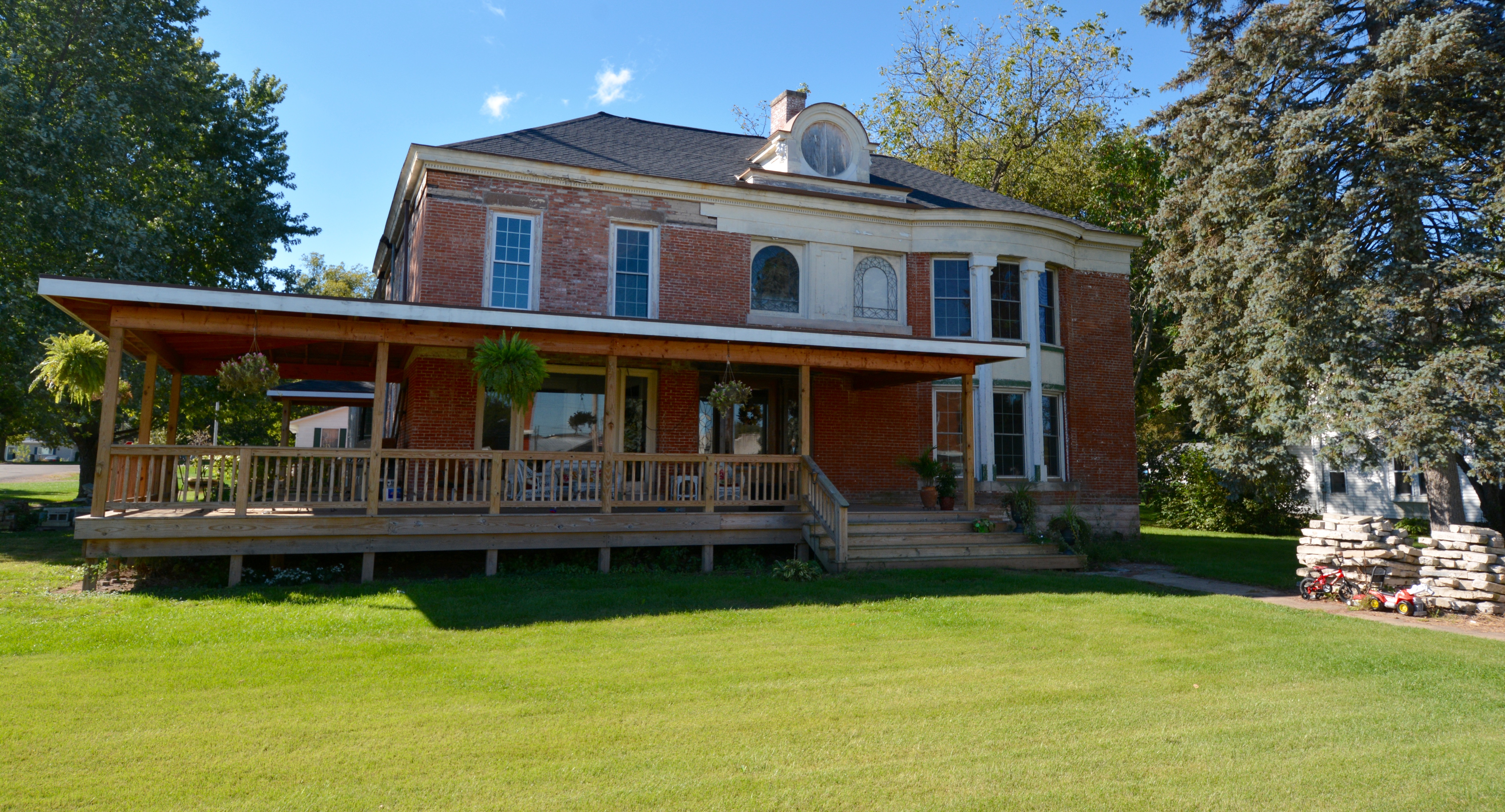
- The Stevens House
- Nickname: Gem of the Valley
- Location of Tiskilwa in Bureau County, Illinois.
- Coordinates: 41°17′30″N 89°30′12″W
- Country: United States
- State: Illinois
- County: Bureau
- Townships: Indiantown, Arispie

Area
  - Total: 0.517 sq mi (1.34 km^{2})
  - Land: 0.517 sq mi (1.34 km^{2})
  - Water: 0.00 sq mi (0 km^{2})
- Elevation: 522 ft (159 m)

Population (2020)
  - Total: 740
  - Density: 1,400/sq mi (550/km^{2})
- Time zone: UTC-6 (CST)
  - Summer (DST): UTC-5 (CDT)
- ZIP code: 61368
- Area code: 815
- FIPS code: 17-75549
- GNIS feature ID: 2399989
- Website: tiskilwa.gov

Tiskilwa is a village in Bureau County, Illinois, United States. The population was 728 at the 2022 census. It is part of the Ottawa Micropolitan Statistical Area.

Exelon Wind, a division of Exelon Power, owns and operates the Illinois Wind AgriWind Project in Tiskilwa.

== History ==
=== Early history ===
Prior to and following European settlement in Illinois, Tiskilwa (formerly called Indiantown) was a Potawatomi village. In 1836, Augustus Langworthy platted and established a town called Windsor where Tiskilwa now stands. In 1840, Windsor and Indiantown were consolidated and renamed to Tiskilwa. Tiskilwa was then officially incorporated in 1856. Tiskilwa emerged as a regional economic and cultural center integrating its own administrative capacities, schools, churches and shops serving a small population of townspeople and farm families from the surrounding 3 to 5 miles (5 to 8 km). It was a small community whose center was three blocks of Main Street around which were located its churches, cafes, taverns, grocery stores, beauty parlors, barbershops and other businesses.

=== History of Tiskilwa Schools ===
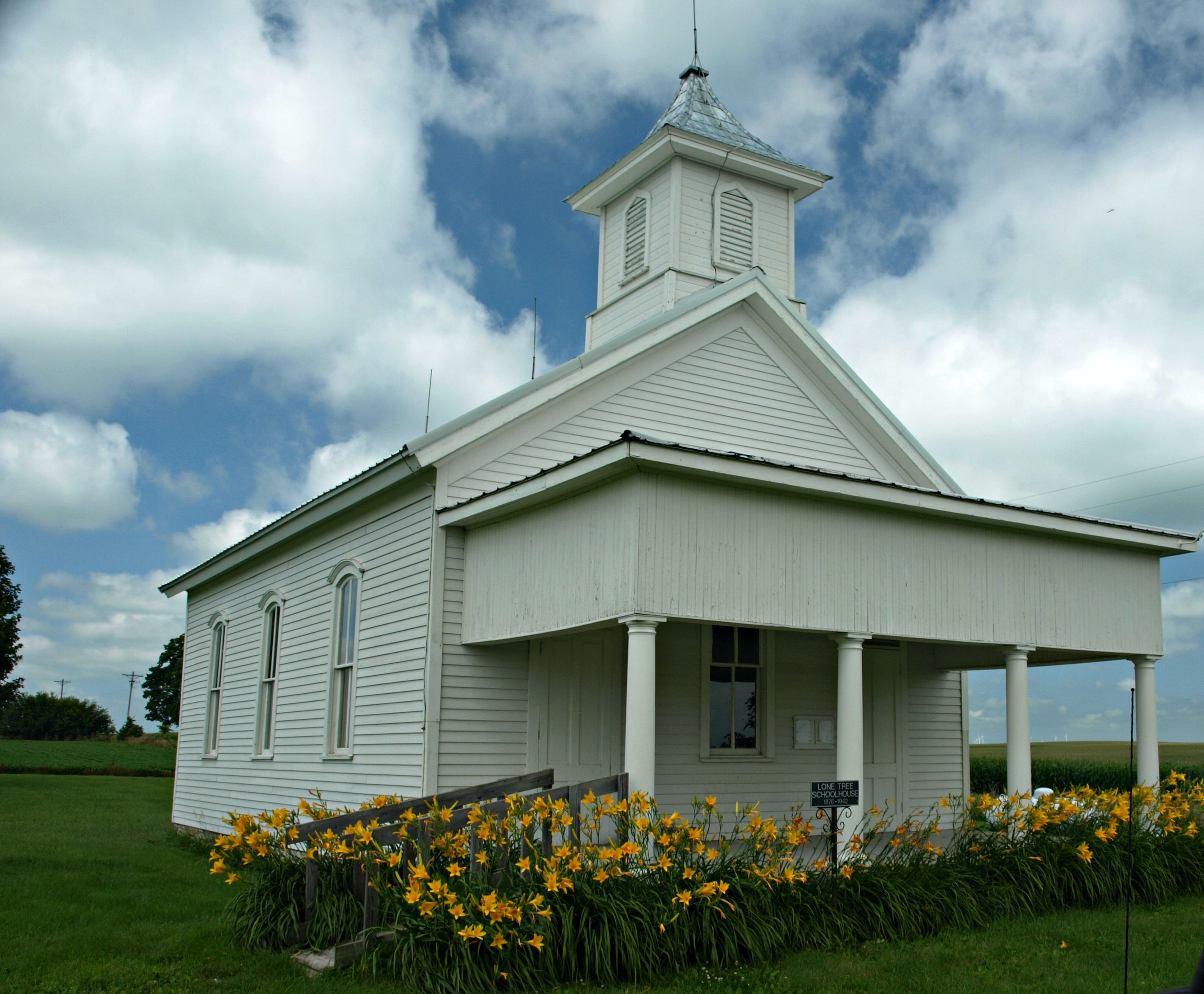
Country school in Tiskilwa

Tiskilwa High School closed in 1996. High school students from Tiskilwa now attend Princeton High School (Illinois). Tiskilwa grade school is now owned by the Princeton Elementary School District and houses the Bureau Marshall Putnam counties' special education cooperative (BMP), and the Bureau County Special Schools Bureau Educational Support Team (BEST Program), a public K-12 alternative school.

The first school buildings in Tiskilwa dated to 1838. A newer building was erected in 1867. In 1978, the modern high school building was erected, which closed with the deactivation of the school system in 1996. The first graduating class from Tiskilwa was in 1878 with a graduating class membership of two.

== Geography ==
According to the 2021 census gazetteer files, Tiskilwa has a total area of 0.52 square miles (1.35 km^{2}), all land.

== Demographics ==
Historical population
Census	Pop.	Note	%±
1860	559		—
1870	761		36.1%
1880	753		−1.1%
1890	801		6.4%
1900	965		20.5%
1910	857		−11.2%
1920	915		6.8%
1930	893		−2.4%
1940	920		3.0%
1950	962		4.6%
1960	951		−1.1%
1970	973		2.3%
1980	990		1.7%
1990	830		−16.2%
2000	787		−5.2%
2010	829		5.3%
2020	740		−10.7%
U.S. Decennial Census

As of the 2020 census there were 740 people, 298 households, and 191 families residing in the village. The population density was 1,431.33 inhabitants per square mile (552.64/km^{2}). There were 340 housing units at an average density of 657.64 per square mile (253.92/km^{2}). The racial makeup of the village was 92.43% White, 0.27% African American, 0.41% Asian, 0.41% from other races, and 6.49% from two or more races. Hispanic or Latino of any race were 2.30% of the population.

There were 298 households, out of which 30.5% had children under the age of 18 living with them, 45.64% were married couples living together, 10.07% had a female householder with no husband present, and 35.91% were non-families. 34.56% of all households were made up of individuals, and 20.13% had someone living alone who was 65 years of age or older. The average household size was 2.92 and the average family size was 2.33.

The village's age distribution consisted of 22.7% under the age of 18, 9.5% from 18 to 24, 16.4% from 25 to 44, 28.9% from 45 to 64, and 22.4% who were 65 years of age or older. The median age was 46.6 years. For every 100 females, there were 96.3 males. For every 100 females age 18 and over, there were 88.7 males.

The median income for a household in the village was $41,071, and the median income for a family was $53,250. Males had a median income of $40,139 versus $21,375 for females. The per capita income for the village was $22,328. About 17.3% of families and 21.8% of the population were below the poverty line, including 30.6% of those under age 18 and 12.3% of those age 65 or over.

== Festivals ==
=== Strawberry Festival ===
Tiskilwa's Strawberry and Artisan Festival is held on the second Saturday in June; it celebrates Tiskilwa's strawberry season and showcases area artists. The festival offers fresh berries and strawberry shortcake, live entertainment, children's activities and food vendors in downtown Tiskilwa from late morning through early afternoon.

=== Pow Wow Days ===
Tiskilwa celebrates Pow Wow Days annually during first weekend in August. This is a three-day event with a community concert or big band dancing, children's "Little Spurs Rodeo" (which was discontinued in 2021), a parade, a Native American pow wow, a beer garden, 4-H Club and cheerleader-sponsored food stands, church-sponsored lunches, historical tours, antique automobiles and tractors, and other events. Pow Wow Days was founded in 1976 as part of the national bicentennial.

== Notable people ==
- Warren Giles, professional baseball executive, born in Tiskilwa
- Charles Torrey Simpson, botanist, malacologist and conservationist
- Lilian Whiting, journalist, editor, and author of poetry and short stories
