= Whitin =

Whitin can refer to

- Paul Whitin (1767–1831), American blacksmith
- Sarah Elizabeth Whitin, benefactor of the astronomical observatory owned and operated by Wellesley College
- Thomson M. Whitin (1923–2013), American management scientist

== See also ==
- Whitin Machine Works
- Whitin Observatory
- Whitinsville, Massachusetts
- Whiting (disambiguation)
