= List of symbols =

Many (but not all) graphemes that are part of a writing system that encodes a full spoken language are included in the Unicode standard, which also includes graphical symbols. See:

- Language code
- List of Unicode characters
- List of writing systems
- Punctuation
- List of typographical symbols and punctuation marks

The remainder of this list focuses on graphemes not part of spoken language-encoding systems.

== Basic communication ==
- ⃠ — No symbol
- Character
- Circled dot
- Emoji
  - ☺ — Smiley
- ✓ — checkmark (UK: tick)
- Harvey balls – Graphic symbols used to compare quality
- ☆ — Star (polygon)
- I - signal
- 0 - lack of signal, hence: [I]/[0]

== Scientific and engineering symbols ==
- Alchemical symbols
- Astronomical symbols
  - Planet symbols
- Chemical symbols
- Electronic symbol (for circuit diagrams, etc.)
- Engineering drawing symbols
- Energy Systems Language
- Hazard symbols
- List of mathematical constants (typically letters and compound symbols)
- Glossary of mathematical symbols
- List of physical constants (typically letters and compound symbols)
- List of common physics notations (typically letters used as variable names in equations)
- Rod of Asclepius / Caduceus as a symbol of medicine

== Consumer symbols ==
- Various currency signs (sublist)

=== Navigational symbols ===
- Traffic signs, including warning signs contain many specialized symbols (see article for list)
- DOT pictograms
- ISO 7001
- Exit sign, a.k.a. "running man"
- Gender symbols for public toilets
- Map symbol
  - Japanese map symbols
- International Breastfeeding Symbol
- International Symbol of Access
- National Library Symbol (United States)
- Barber's pole

=== Food ===
- EC identification and health marks, for animal products
- Food safe symbol marking food contact materials in the European Union
- British Egg Industry Council lion

Kosher symbols

- Star-K Kosher Certification
- OK Kosher Certification
- EarthKosher Kosher Certification

=== General consumer products ===
- Recycling symbol
  - Recycling codes
  - Japanese recycling symbols
  - Green Dot (symbol)
- Laundry symbol
- Period-after-opening symbol (on cosmetics as 6M, 12M, 18M, etc.)
- U+2602 ☂ UMBRELLA - keep dry
- U+2614 ☔ UMBRELLA WITH RAIN DROPS - keep dry
- Japanese postal mark
- ℮, the European estimated sign U+212E
- Inventory tracking symbols
  - Barcode such as a Universal Product Code
  - QR code
- Printing registration marks intended for the manufacturer of the packaging, to ensure different colors are aligned when printed
- Various certification marks (see article for list) signifying conformance with a government or private organization's requirements
- Shipping symbols from ISO standard 780 "Pictorial marking for handling of goods" or ASTM D5445 "Standard Practice for Pictorial Markings for Handling of Goods" which depict shipping boxes as squares with rounded corners:
  - "Fragile": the silhouette of a broken wine glass
  - "This end up": a horizontal line with two arrows pointing up
  - "Do not stack": a filled-in box, under a crossed-out outlined box
  - "Maximum stack height": three boxes stacked vertically; the bottom one is filled in, the middle one is an outline with a number inside (the number of boxes to safely stack on top of this one), and the top one is an outline and crossed out
  - "Maximum stack weight": from the bottom upward: a box, a horizontal line, a wide arrow pointing down, and a number followed by "kg max"
  - "Keep dry": an umbrella with rain falling on it
  - "Protect from sunlight": a circle with rays coming out of it, with a box protected by a chevron
  - "Protect from radiation": the radiation symbol, separated from a box by a chevron
  - "Center of gravity": crosshairs pointing to the center of a dashed circle
  - "Do not roll": a box with a curved arrow above, and a cross-out line coming up from the box at an angle
  - "Do not use hand hooks"
  - "Do not use hand truck"
  - "Do not use forklift"
  - "Clamp as indicated": a filled-in box with a vertical line and inward-pointing arrow on the right and left
  - "Do not clamp": the same as "clamp as indicated", crossed out
  - "Sling here": the silhouette of a chain
  - A thermometer with a diagonal slash, indicating the maximum and minimum temperature

=== Property and pricing ===
- U+2122 ™ TRADE MARK SIGN
- U+2120 ℠ SERVICE MARK
- U+00AE ® REGISTERED SIGN
- U+2117 ℗ SOUND RECORDING COPYRIGHT
- U+24CDⓍ, U+24E8 Ⓨ - Japanese typographic symbols used under Japan's resale price maintenance system
- Various logos
- Various trademarks

== Technology symbols ==
- Media control symbols
- Power symbol
- Unicode symbols
- Various computer icons

== Naval ==
- Jolly Roger - "this ship is controlled by pirates"
- International Code of Signals
- International maritime signal flags

== Religious and mystical symbols ==
Religious symbols

A subset has been used as United States Department of Veterans Affairs emblems for headstones and markers.

=== A ===
- Adinkra symbols
- Alchemical symbols
- الله Allah
- Angel Moroni
- Ankh
- Armenian eternity sign
- Astrological sign
- Astrological symbols
- Astrology and alchemy
- ॐ Aum/Om syllable (sound symbol)

=== B ===
- Ba guahi
- Bahá'í symbols
- Bhavacakra
- Bindi
- Bindu
- Borjgali

=== C ===
- ☤ Caduceus, a symbol of commerce, often erroneously used as a symbol of medicine.
- Camunian rose
- Celtic cross
- חַי Chai
- ΧΡ Chi Rho
- Christian symbolism
  - Christian cross / Christian cross variants
- Conch shell
- Coptic cross
- ☽ Crescent
- Cross
- Cross and Crown
- Cross and flame
- Cross of Sacrifice
- Cross of St. Peter
- Crucifix
- Crux Gemmata

=== D ===
- Dharmacakra
- Dhvaja
- Divided line of Plato
- Dragon
- Dragon's Eye

=== E ===
- Eight auspicious symbols of Tibetan Buddhism
- ੴ Ek Onkar
- Endless knot
- Enneagram
- ⊙ Eye of God
- Eye of Horus
- Eye of Providence

=== F ===
- Flaming chalice
- Fleur-de-lis

=== G ===
- Gankyil
- Globus cruciger
- Golden spiral
- Goetic seals
- Geometry symbols

=== H ===
- Hamsa
- Hands of God
- Happy Human
- Heart
- High cross
- Holy Grail
- Holy Bible

=== I ===
- Ichthys
- Infinity
- Inuksuk
- Information
- Illuminati
- Irminsul

=== K ===
- Kagome crest
- Khamsa/Hamesh Hand/Hand of Fatima
- Khachkar
- Khanda

=== L ===
- Labarum
  - Cantabrian labarum
- Labrys
- Lauburu
- Life
- Lingam
- Lotus
- Looped square

=== M ===
- Maltese Cross
- Mandala
- Medicine wheel
- Menorah
- Merkaba
- Math
- Mjölnir

=== N ===
- Ner tamid
- Nataraj
- Nishan Sahib

=== O ===
- O1G
- Occult symbols
- Ouroboros

=== P ===
- Papal cross
- Patriarchal cross
- Pearl
- Pentacle
- Pentagram

=== Q ===
- Quincunx

=== R ===
- Raven banner
- Red Cross
- Red Rose of Lancaster
- Rod of Asclepius
- Rub el Hizb

=== S ===
- Sacred Chao
- Sacred Heart
- Saint symbolism
- Scientology symbols
- Shield of the Trinity
- Sigil
  - Sigillum Dei
  - Sigil of Baphomet
  - Sigils of demons
- Skull and crossbones, Jolly Roger
- Solar symbols
  - Radiate crown
  - Sunburst
  - Sun of May
  - Vergina Sun
  - Winged sun
- Soyombo symbol
- Star
- Star and crescent
- Star of David
- Starburst
- Star polygon
  - Five-pointed star
  - Arabic star
- Sun cross
- Swastika
- Square and Compasses

=== T ===
- Taiji
  - Taegeuk
  - Taijitu
- Tanit symbol
- Tarot iconography
- Tattva symbols
- Tetractys
- Thor's Hammer
- Tilaka
- Tomoe
- Torii
- Three hares
- Tree of Life
- Tree of Peace
- Trefoil
- Trimurti
- Triple Goddess
- Triple spiral
- Triquetra
- Triratna/Three Jewels
- Triskelion
- Tudor Rose
- Tursaansydän
- Turtle

=== U ===
- Unicursal hexagram
- Urantia symbols

=== V ===
- Vajra
- Valknut
- Vande matram
- Vesica piscis

=== W ===
- White buffalo
- White Rose of York
- White stag
- Wreath

=== Y ===
- Yantra
- Yin-yang
- Yoni

== Heraldic symbols ==
- Charge (heraldry)
- Coat of arms
  - List of coats of arms
- Mon (emblem)
- Mullet
- Monogram
- Flag
  - Vexillology / Glossary of vexillology
  - Maritime flag
- Insignia

== Historical ==
- Gediminid
- House mark
- Pūloʻuloʻu
- Rurikid
- Tamga

== Sports and games ==
- Chess symbols in Unicode
- Olympic symbols
- Paralympic symbols

== Political symbols ==
- Anarchist symbolism
- Communist symbolism
- Electoral symbol
- Fascist symbolism
  - Flash and circle
  - Francoist Symbol
  - Meander
  - Nazi symbolism
    - Black Sun
- National symbol / Lists of national symbols
  - Cockade
  - Religion in national symbols
  - Religious symbolism in the United States military
  - Roundel
    - Military aircraft insignia
- Raised fist
- Other
  - Sun of the Alps
  - Yiddish symbols
  - Z

== Other ==
- Color / Color symbolism
  - St. Patrick's blue
- Cigar store Indian
- Currency symbol
- Esperanto symbols
- Extinction symbol
- Hexafoil
- LGBT symbols
- Lucky symbols
- Mascot
- Musical symbols
- Overlapping circles grid
- Peace symbols
- Plant symbolism
  - Hanakotoba
  - Maple leaf
  - Rose
    - Sub rosa
  - Shamrock
- Status symbol
  - Badge of shame
- Vegetarian and vegan symbolism

== See also ==
- Climate Clock
- Cultural icon
- Iconography
  - Aureola
  - Halo
  - Speech scroll
- International common standards
- Logo
- Motif
- Notation
- Ornament
- Pictogram
- Sign
- Typography
