= Raspberry (color) =

Color that resembles the color of raspberries

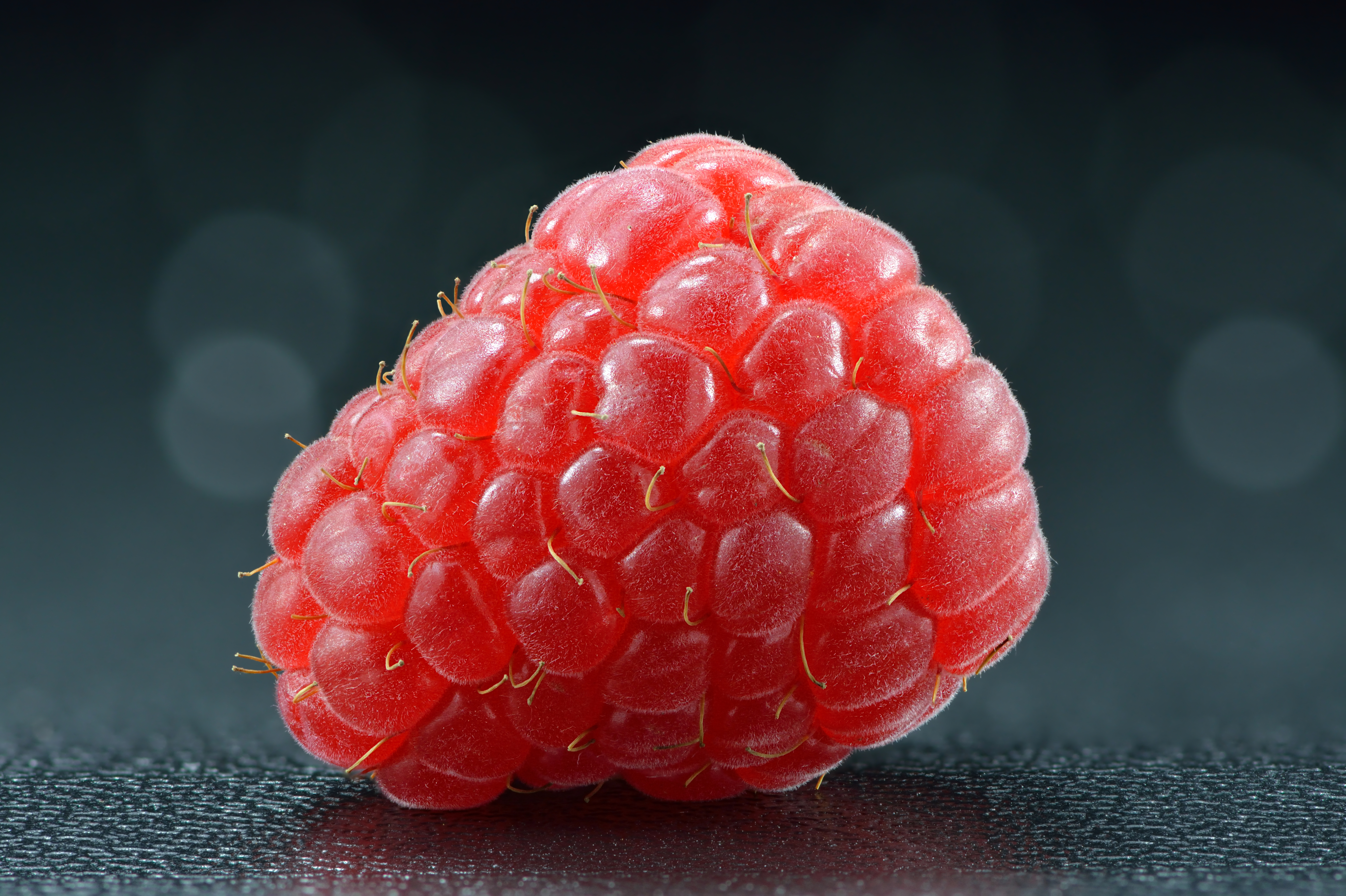
- Whole raspberry

Color coordinates
- Hex triplet: #E30B5D
- sRGB^{B} (r, g, b): (227, 11, 93)
- HSV (h, s, v): (337°, 95%, 89%)
- CIELCh_{uv} (L, C, h): (49, 134, 1°)
- Source: Maerz and Paul
- ISCC–NBS descriptor: Vivid red
- B: Normalized to [0–255] (byte)

Raspberry is a color that resembles the color of raspberries.

It is a bright, vivid shade of red.

The first recorded use of raspberry as a color name in English was in 1892. The colour is sourced by Maerz and Paul below.

== Variations ==
=== French raspberry ===
French Raspberry

Color coordinates
- Hex triplet: #C42C48
- sRGB^{B} (r, g, b): (196, 44, 72)
- HSV (h, s, v): (349°, 78%, 77%)
- CIELCh_{uv} (L, C, h): (44, 109, 6°)
- Source: Pourpre.com
- ISCC–NBS descriptor: Vivid red
- B: Normalized to [0–255] (byte)

At right is displayed the color French raspberry, which is the deep rich tone of raspberry called framboise (French name of the raspberry) in the Pourpre.com color list, a color list widely popular in France.

=== Raspberry rose ===
Raspberry Rose

Color coordinates
- Hex triplet: #B3446C
- sRGB^{B} (r, g, b): (179, 68, 108)
- HSV (h, s, v): (338°, 62%, 70%)
- CIELCh_{uv} (L, C, h): (45, 72, 354°)
- Source: ISCC-NBS
- ISCC–NBS descriptor: Moderate purplish red
- B: Normalized to [0–255] (byte)

At right is displayed the color raspberry rose.

The color raspberry rose is a deep tone of raspberry.

The first recorded use of raspberry rose as a color name in English was in 1950, in the Descriptive Color Names Dictionary.

The normalized color coordinates for raspberry rose are identical to irresistible, which was first recorded as a color name in English in 1948, in the Plochere Color System.

=== Raspberry glacé ===
Raspberry Glacé

Color coordinates
- Hex triplet: #915F6D
- sRGB^{B} (r, g, b): (145, 95, 109)
- HSV (h, s, v): (343°, 34%, 57%)
- CIELCh_{uv} (L, C, h): (46, 31, 354°)
- Source: Plochere
- ISCC–NBS descriptor: Grayish purplish red
- B: Normalized to [0–255] (byte)

The color raspberry glacé is displayed on the right. It is a medium shade of raspberry that is used in interior design, fashion, design and art. It also resembles the colour of luscious hue of ripe raspberries.

The first recorded use of raspberry glacé as a color name in English was in 1926.

The source of this color is the Plochere Color System, a color system formulated in 1948 that is widely used by interior designers.

The normalized color coordinates for raspberry glacé are identical to mauve taupe, first recorded as a color name in English in 1925.

=== Dark raspberry ===
Dark Raspberry

Color coordinates
- Hex triplet: #872657
- sRGB^{B} (r, g, b): (135, 38, 87)
- HSV (h, s, v): (330°, 72%, 53%)
- CIELCh_{uv} (L, C, h): (32, 58, 345°)
- Source: Xona.com Color List
- ISCC–NBS descriptor: Deep purplish red
- B: Normalized to [0–255] (byte)

At right is displayed the dark tone of raspberry that is called "raspberry" on the Xona Games Color List.

Dark raspberry is a color that resembles the color of a black raspberry.

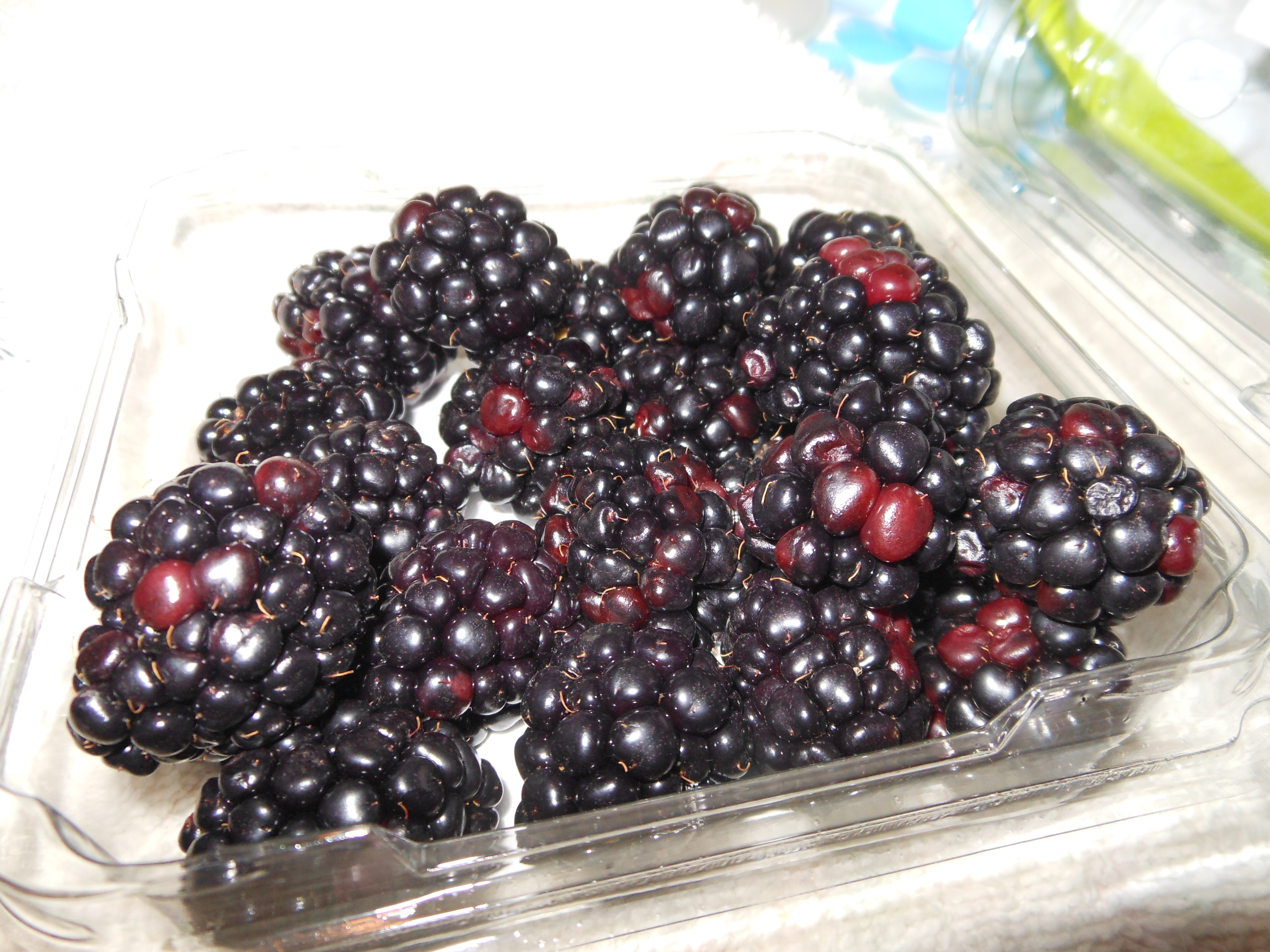
Black raspberries

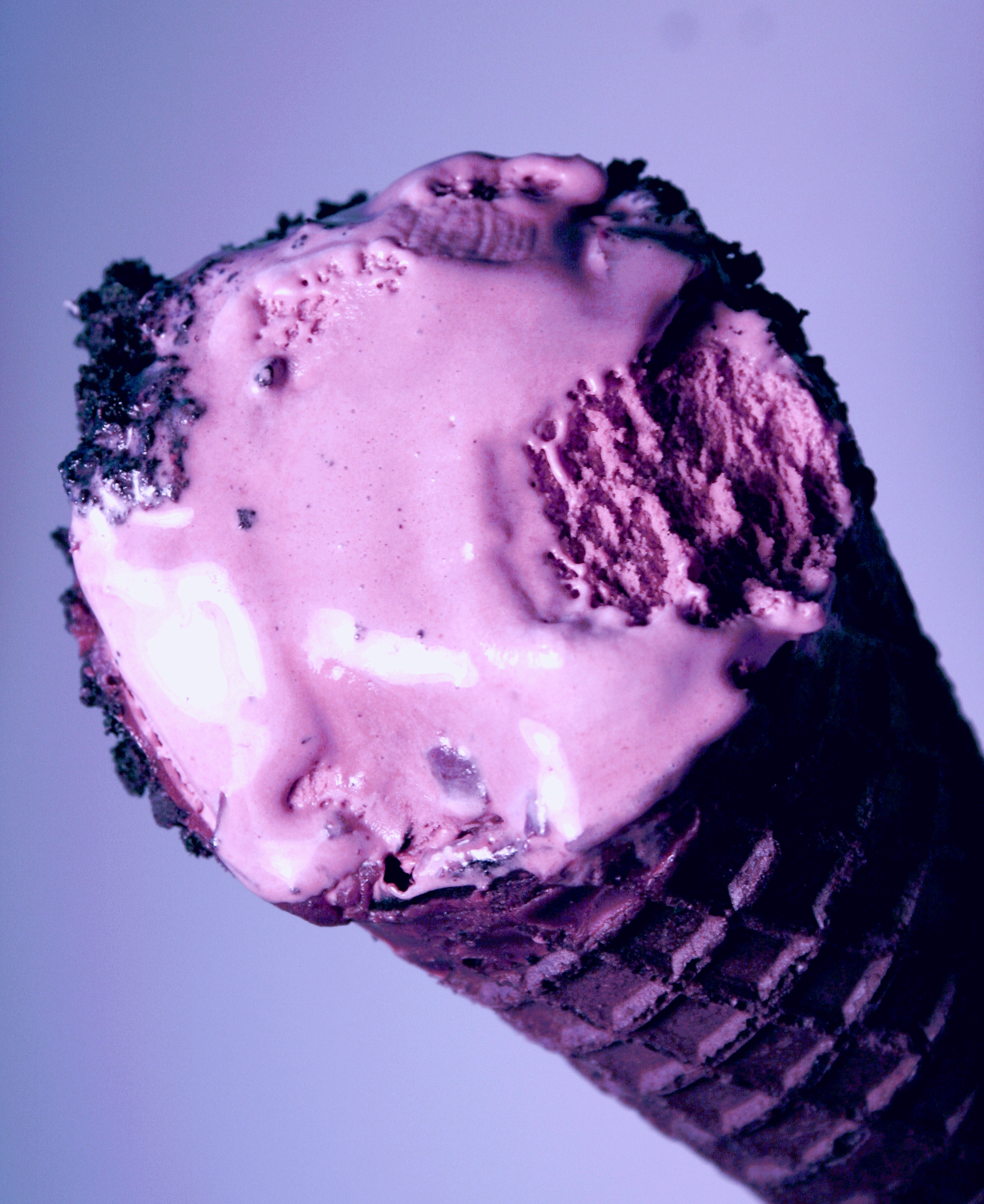
Black raspberry ice cream

Dark raspberry is also the color of regular raspberries that have been boiled down into raspberry jam or sauce with sugar to use for cake filling, filling for French pancakes, ice cream topping, etc.

== In culture ==
=== Music ===
- Perhaps the most famous mention of the colour raspberry was by Prince, in his popular song, "Raspberry Beret".

=== Vexillology ===
- The colour raspberry has been used in Cossack ethnic flags and uniforms.

== See also ==
- RAL 3027 Raspberry red
- List of colors
