= RPC Group =

European plastic packaging company

- Type: Public
- Traded as: LSE: RPC
- Industry: Plastic Products (Packaging & Non-Packaging)
- Founded: 1988 as Reedpack Containers; 1991 as RPC Containers
- Headquarters: Rushden, Northamptonshire
- Key people: Jamie Pike, Chairman Pim Vervaat, Chief Executive
- Revenue: £3,747.7 million (2018)
- Operating income: £425.0 million (2018)
- Net income: £253.8 million (2018)
- Number of employees: 24,295 (2018)
- Website: www.rpc-group.com

RPC Group plc (LSE: RPC) is based in the United Kingdom, and is one of Europe's largest supplier of plastic packaging. Its headquarters are in Rushden in Northamptonshire. It was listed on the London Stock Exchange until it was acquired in 2019 by Berry Global Group Inc, which in turn was acquired by Amcor in 2025.

== History ==
The company's origins lie in a plastic packaging production unit at Oakham established by a Danish group, Superfos, in 1973. The plant was acquired by Reed International in 1983 and was the subject of a management buyout as Reedpack Containers in 1988, but was then bought by Svenska Cellulosa Aktiebolaget in 1990. The business was then the subject of a management buyout from Svenska Cellulosa Aktiebolaget in 1991. It was first listed on the London Stock Exchange in 1993. It went on to buy Continental Plastics Europe, with 12 sites across Europe, in 1997 and Wiko, an injection moulding business based in Germany, in July 2000. In December 2010, it bought Superfos Industries, its former parent, for about €240 million (£203 million).

== Acquisitions ==
In December 2013, the company acquired Maynard & Harris Plastics, a manufacturer of rigid plastic packaging, for £103.5 million and in May 2014, it bought Ace Corporation Holdings, a Chinese injection moulder, for up to $430 million. It then bought Promens, with 50 plants internationally, in a €386 million (£306 million) deal in December 2014.

For 2016, the company earned £2.75 billion, a two-thirds jump in revenue from the year before after a series of acquisitions. Among those acquisitions were the bottle-top maker GCS in France and British Polythene Industries. In March 2016, the company bought French bottle-top maker Global Closure Systems for €650 million (£468.7 million) to strengthen its position in Europe's plastic packaging market, and in August 2016, the company bought British Polythene Industries for £261 million. It went on to buy Letica, an American business, for $640 million in February 2017. As of June 2017, Pim Vervaat is chief executive. Since December 2015, RPC had completed 11 acquisitions.

== Take-over ==
The company announced in March 2019 that it had agreed to be taken over by Berry Global Group Inc.

== Operations ==
The company makes a wide variety of plastic food-packaging products including Heinz Tomato Ketchup, Nivea, L'Oréal, Saxa, Jacob's, McVitie's and Hubba Bubba.
