= British Plastics Federation =

- Formation: 21 December 1933

The British Plastics Federation (BPF) is the main trade body for the plastics industry in the UK.

== History ==
It was incorporated on 21 December 1933; the first Chairman was Charles Waghorne of Insulators Limited. It is the longest-established plastics federation in the world.

The 1930s was the decade in which many common plastics were discovered, some in the UK. On 27 March 1933 Reginald Gibson and Eric Fawcett (with Francis Arthur Freeth FRS and Sir Michael Perrin) discovered polyethylene (polythene) at ICI's Winnington Research Laboratory at Winnington, Cheshire.

John Crawford, at the Explosives group of ICI at Ardeer, North Ayrshire near Stevenston, produced a commercial synthesis of poly(methyl methacrylate), also known as Perspex with production beginning in 1934. Polythene is the world's most widespread polymer, and was first produced by ICI from 1939; many plastic bottles are made from LDPE. Polystyrene was invented in Germany in 1937. PTFE was discovered in America (New Jersey) in 1938 by Roy J. Plunkett when at DuPont.

PET beverage bottles were introduced from 1973. PEEK was developed by ICI in 1977. HDPE water pipes were introduced from 1980. In 1988, a number code for recycling plastics was introduced.

== Structure ==
It is headquartered in Old Street in central London. It houses the UK office of the PlasticsEurope Europe-wide organisation.

== Membership ==
Companies in the BPF include:

- BASF
- Polypipe
- RPC Group
- Rehau Group

== Function ==
It represents the UK plastics industry. It runs its Plastipedia, a resource on plastics. In 2009 it launched the Plastics 2020 Challenge.

== Plastipedia ==
Plastipedia is an online encyclopedia about plastics, starting from their birth in 1862 with the invention of Parkesine; it is hosted and maintained by the BPF. It has a comprehensive list of plastic manufacturing processes, and lists the 25 main processing technologies, including detailed animations. It also deals with energy management in the plastic industry and offers a guide to the main standards associated with the plastic industry.

== See also ==
- PET bottle recycling
- Society of the Plastics Industry
