= Green Dot (symbol) =

License symbol of a European recycling network

The Green Dot symbol

The Green Dot (German: Der Grüne Punkt) is the financing symbol of a European network of industry-funded systems for recycling the packaging materials of consumer goods. The logo is a trademark protected worldwide. It is not a recycling logo.

== Background ==
The German "Der Grüne Punkt" is considered the forerunner of the European scheme. It was originally introduced by Der Grüne Punkt - Duales System Deutschland GmbH (DSD) in 1990 before the introduction of a Packaging Ordinance under the Waste Act. Since the successful introduction of the German industry-funded dual system, similar Green Dot systems have been introduced in most other European countries.

The Green Dot scheme is covered under the European Union's packaging and packaging waste directive, which is binding on all companies whose products use packaging, and requires manufacturers to recover their own packaging. According to the directive, companies are held responsible for the end-of-life management of their packaging, either through self-compliance or through joining a self-compliant producer responsibility organization (PRO).

Since its European introduction, the scheme has been rolled out to 31 European countries. Use of the symbol on packaging is voluntary but if it is used, producers need to ensure a valid contract with the respective organizations. However, environmentalists claim that some countries deliberately turn a blind eye to the European directive.

The Green Dot is used by more than 130,000 companies, encompassing more than 200 billion packages globally.

== Concept ==
The Green Dot system was conceived by Klaus Töpfer, Germany's environment minister in the early 1990s. The aim of the Green Dot is to indicate to consumers who see the logo that the manufacturer of the product contributes to the cost of recovery and recycling. This can be with household waste collected by the authorities (e.g. in special bags—in Germany these are yellow), or in containers in public places such as car parks and outside supermarkets.

The system is financed by the "Green Dot" licence fee paid by the manufacturers. Fees vary by country and are based on the material used in packaging (e.g. paper, plastic, metal, wood or cardboard). Each country also has different fees for joining the scheme and ongoing fixed and variable fees. Fees also take into account the cost of collection, sorting and recycling methods.

In simple terms, the system encourages manufacturers to cut down on packaging as this saves them the cost of licence fees.

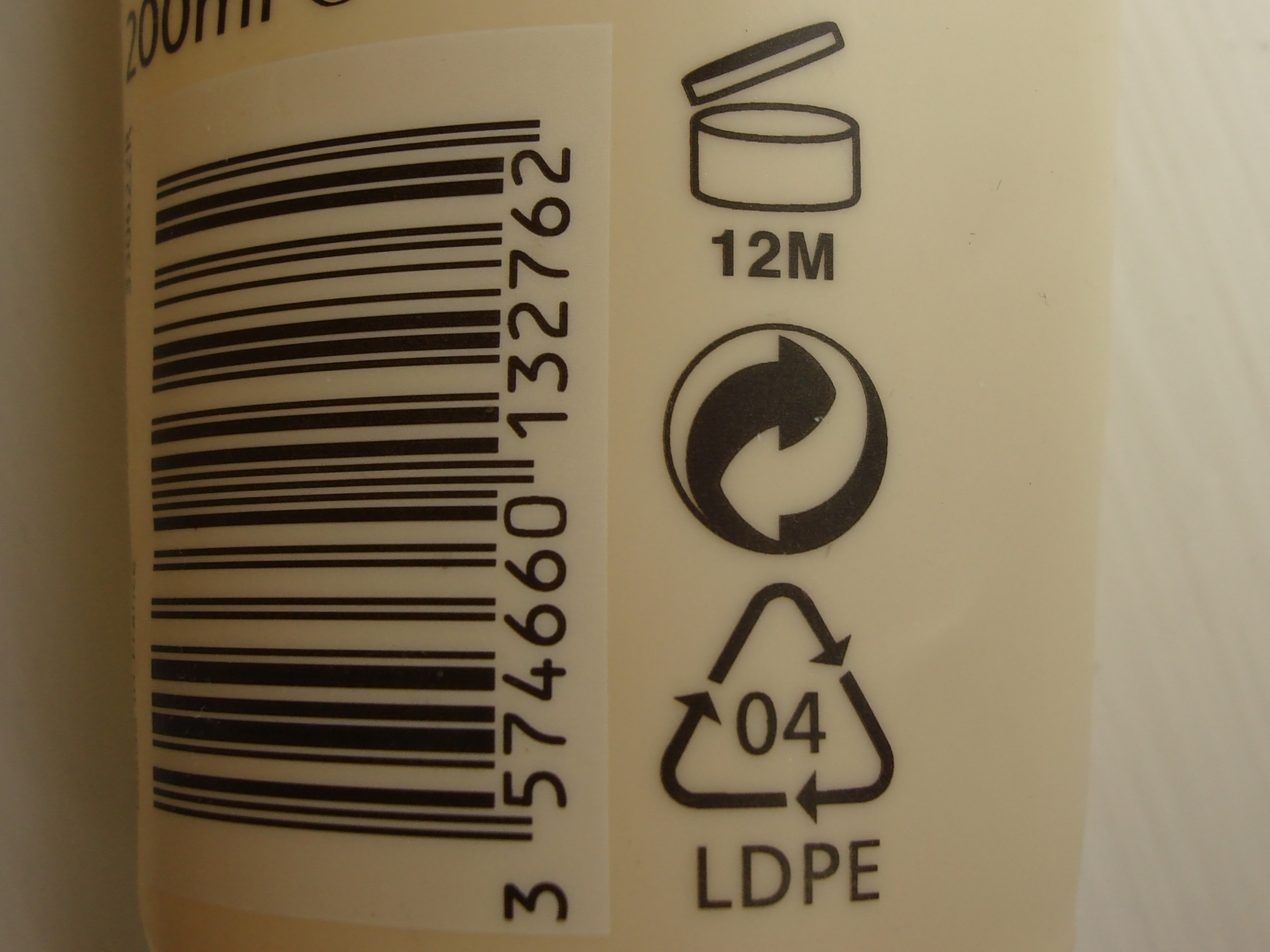
Black-and-white version of the "Der Grüne Punkt" DSD logo on a bottle of lotion, located between the PAO symbol and the resin identification code for LDPE, next to an EAN-13 barcode

== German dual system of waste collection ==
In 1991, the German government passed a packaging law (Verordnung über die Vermeidung und Verwertung von Verpackungsabfällen, short: Verpackungsverordnung, abbreviated as VerpackV) also known as German Packaging Ordinance. This requires manufacturers to take care of the recycling or disposal of any packaging material they sell. As a result of this law, German industry set up a "dual system" of waste collection, which picks up household packaging in parallel to the existing municipal waste-collection systems. This industry-funded system is operated in Germany by the Duales System Deutschland GmbH (German for "Dual System Germany Ltd") corporation, or short DSD.

All companies distributing packaged products in Germany are obligated to participate in a PRO such as "Der Grüne Punkt - Duales System Deutschland GmbH". DSD license fee payers can then add the Green Dot logo to their package labelling to indicate that this package should be placed into the separate yellow bags or yellow waste bins that will then be collected and emptied by waste collection vehicles and sorted (and where possible recycled) in sorting and recycling facilities.

German licence fees are calculated using the weight of packs, each material type used and the volumes of product produced.

On 1 January 2019, the German Verpackungsverordnung was replaced by the German Verpackungsgesetz (Gesetz über das Inverkehrbringen, die Rücknahme und die hochwertige Verwertung von Verpackungen, abbreviated as VerpackG) to address the EU packaging and packaging waste directive 94/62/EC, implemented through the Stiftung Zentrale Stelle Verpackungsregister (ZSVR) with the LUCID database. This is also known as German Packaging Act or German EPR law.

== Management ==
Worldwide stewardship of the Green Dot logo is managed by PRO Europe (Packaging Recovery Organisation Europe) on behalf of the various national Green dot organizations across Europe.

== Symbol design and confusion ==
The design of the Green Dot symbol has obvious links with the Chinese Taijitu (yin and yang) symbol and Gary Anderson's recycling symbol. Where full-colour printing is available, its official form is printed in a light and a dark shade of green (Pantone 366C and 343C). For cost reasons or to avoid a visual clash with other symbols, many manufacturers chose a black-and-white or other colour combination on their packages.

The Green Dot logo merely indicates that a company has joined the Green Dot scheme, and not necessarily that the package is fully recyclable. The logo is often confused with the recycling logo.

== See also ==
- Recycling symbol
- Japanese recycling symbols
- Remondis
