= MyGreenElectronics =

The international recycling symbol

myGreenElectronics is a public service online portal for consumers to recycle or reuse their electronics products once they have reached end-of-life. It was designed by The Consumer Electronics Association to empower consumers to make what some people consider "responsible choices" throughout their products’ life cycle (purchasing, use, reuse, and recycling), but does not specifically endorse any one company or business practice, and is meant to be an objective resource.

== Uses ==
There are two main ways that consumers use this site

1. It allows consumers to identify "green products". The green product database includes various items such as baby monitors, cell phones, plasma TVs and eco-friendly accessories.
2. It gives consumers the opportunity to find an electronics recycler in their area using a zip-code search.

== Additional components ==
Aside from the immediate functional uses, the site educates the public on how to "reduce" their energy usage and "rethink" the way they consume electronics products. In order to "reduce" the amount of electricity consumer's products consume, it advises that consumers look for the Energy Star logo on the products that they buy. A comprehensive list of advice and recommendations are available in the "Reduce" section of the site. Thus, it encourages consumers to "rethink" ways in which they can make smarter, environmentally friendlier choices when purchasing electronics products.

== Varying perspectives on electronics recycling ==
There are some entities in the United States and abroad that raise serious concerns about electronics recycling. Some groups are concerned that the workers who do the actual recycling are exposed to toxins that can be harmful to their health. MyGreenElectronics represents a consumer-driven voluntary approach to recycling. Some people believe that the government should do more to compel consumers to pay for an advance fee for the future recycling cost of their product. Others believe that manufacturers of electronics should take full responsibility for the recycling or disposal of their products.

=== myGreenElectronics in the news ===
1. Going Green With Your Computer - March 5, 2007 WCCO.com CBS News
2. Some Consumers Opting for Eco-Friendly Computers February 21, 2007 ABC News

== See also ==
- Electronic waste
