= Cerise (color) =

Range of reddish pinks

Color coordinates
- Hex triplet: #FF00BF
- sRGB^{B} (r, g, b): (255, 0, 191)
- HSV (h, s, v): (315°, 100%, 100%)
- CIELCh_{uv} (L, C, h): (57, 127, 332°)
- Source: Maerz and Paul
- ISCC–NBS descriptor: Vivid red
- B: Normalized to [0–255] (byte)

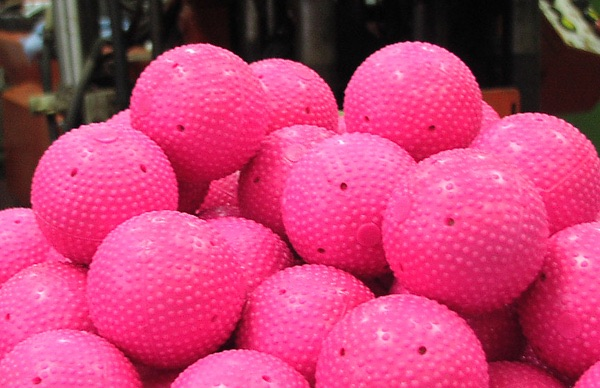
Bandy balls are cerise colored.

Cerise (/səˈriːs/ or /səˈriːz/; French: [sə.ʁiz]) is a dark pink shade.

== Etymology ==
The color or name comes from the French word cerise, meaning "cherry".

According to the Oxford English Dictionary, the first recorded use of cerise as a color name in English was in The Times of November 30, 1858. This date of 1858 as the date of first use of the color name is also mentioned in the 1930 book A Dictionary of Color. However, it was used at least as early as 1845 in a book of crochet patterns.

== Variations of cerise ==
There are various tones of cerise.

=== Hollywood cerise ===
Hollywood Cerise

Color coordinates
- Hex triplet: #F400A1
- sRGB^{B} (r, g, b): (244, 0, 161)
- HSV (h, s, v): (320°, 100%, 96%)
- CIELCh_{uv} (L, C, h): (54, 124, 341°)
- Source: Maerz and Paul/Venus Paradise C.P.
- ISCC–NBS descriptor: Vivid purplish red
- B: Normalized to [0–255] (byte)

In the 1950s, a popular brand of colored pencils, Venus Paradise, had a colored pencil called Hollywood cerise which was this color. Before being renamed Hollywood cerise in the 1940s, the color had been known, since its inception in 1922, simply as Hollywood.

=== Deep cerise ===
Deep Cerise

Color coordinates
- Hex triplet: #DA3287
- sRGB^{B} (r, g, b): (218, 50, 135)
- HSV (h, s, v): (330°, 77%, 85%)
- CIELCh_{uv} (L, C, h): (51, 103, 347°)
- Source: Crayola
- ISCC–NBS descriptor: Vivid purplish red
- B: Normalized to [0–255] (byte)

Displayed adjacent is the deep tone of cerise called cerise in Crayola crayons (see the List of Crayola crayon colors).

The color name cerise has been used for this color since 1993 by Crayola.

=== Irresistible ===
Irresistible

Color coordinates
- Hex triplet: #B3446C
- sRGB^{B} (r, g, b): (179, 68, 108)
- HSV (h, s, v): (338°, 62%, 70%)
- CIELCh_{uv} (L, C, h): (45, 72, 354°)
- Source: Plochere
- ISCC–NBS descriptor: Moderate purplish red
- B: Normalized to [0–255] (byte)

The color irresistible is displayed adjacent.

The color name irresistible first came into use in the Plochere Color System, a color system formulated in 1948 that is widely used by interior designers.

The normalized color coordinates for irresistible are identical to raspberry rose, which was first recorded as a color name in English in 1950 in the Descriptive Color Names Dictionary.

== See also ==
- Fuchsia (color)
- Rose (color)
- Lists of colors
