= 24M =

24M may refer to

- The archaeological site 24M in Red Bay, identified as the 1565 wreck of the ship San Juan
- The Period-after-opening symbol on make-up.
