= Alphington Paper Mill =

Factory in Melbourne, Australia

Amcor Paper Mill
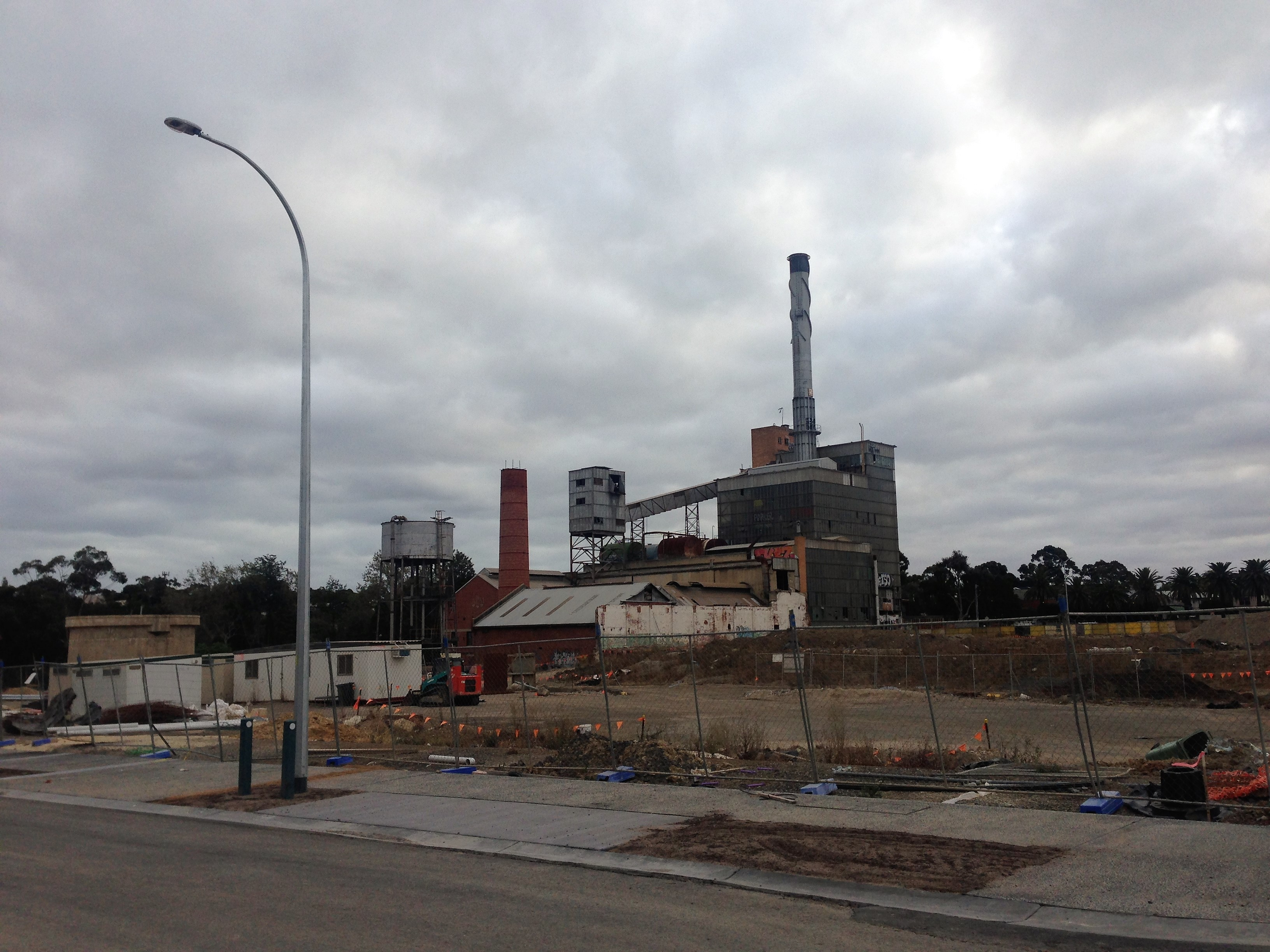
- The Paper Mill's Boiler House in 2019, surrounded by construction
- Interactive map of the Amcor Paper Mill area
- Alternative names: Alphington Paper Mill; Australian Paper Manufacturers Limited Fairfield Mill

General information
- Status: Demolished
- Location: 626 Heidelberg Road, Alphington, Victoria, Australia
- Coordinates: 37°47′1″S 145°1′38″E
- Year built: Paper Mill: 2 years
- Completed: Paper Mill: 1921; Boiler House: 1954
- Management: Amcor

Technical details
- Size: 16.5 ha

Design and construction
- Architect: Boiler House: E. Keith Mackay
- Architecture firm: Boiler House: Mussen, Mackay & Potter
- Engineer: Boiler House: Norman Mussen and Charles Potter

Alphington Paper Mill, which was located in Alphington, Victoria, Australia, was constructed in two years for Australian Paper Manufacturers and opened in 1921, with the Boiler House added in 1954. In 2008, the plant was closed and in 2012, the property was sold to a consortium that planned to redevelop it into a residential area.

== History ==
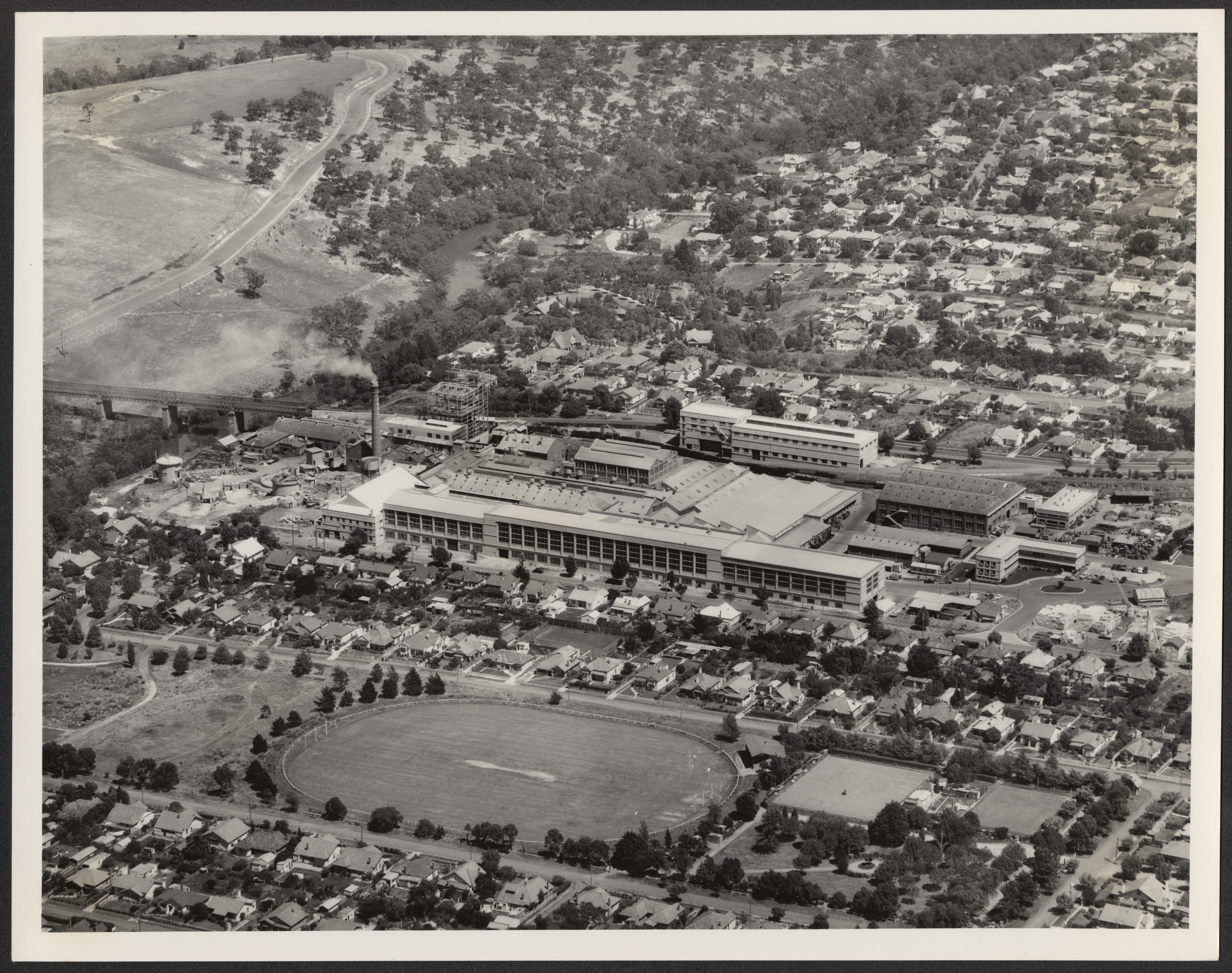
Aerial view of the former APM Alphington Site (1950)

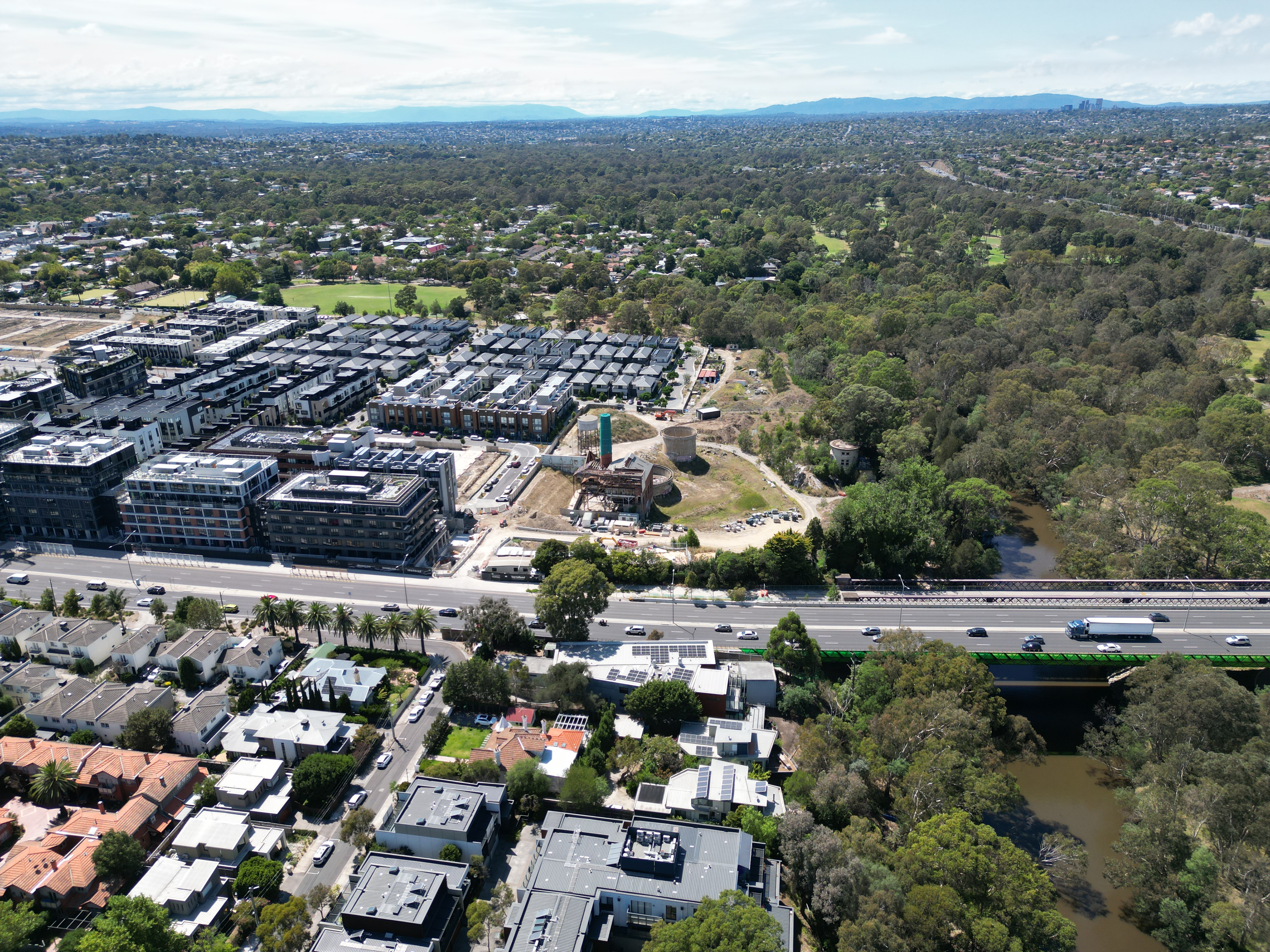
The old Alphington paper mill from above in 2025

=== Construction ===
In August 1918, Australian Paper Manufacturers (APM, later Amcor) purchased the site, which at the time was named Woodlands, to construct a mill. Construction of the building took two years using 1,200,000 bricks and was completed in 1921. In the 1930s, APM heavily expanded its operations on the site, bringing in a 15-ton turbo generator in 1932 and floating A$1 million worth of shares in 1937 to fund further expansion. In 1954, APM constructed the Boiler House, which was designed by Mussen, Mackay and Potter, to house boilers and the turbines powering the mill. The building included one of Melbourne's earliest examples of curtain walling.

=== Closure and redevelopment ===
In 2008, Amcor announced its intentions to close the plant. The following year, state planning minister Justin Madden rezoned the land for mixed-use, allowing "in excess of 2,000 homes as well as retail, office and community facilities along the Yarra River" to be constructed. The property went to market that year and again in 2011; Amcor expected it to sell for A$200 million but the site went unsold. Manufacturing ended in December 2012, when the company moved its operations to a new $500 million plant in Sydney. The Alphington property was sold in 2013 for $120 million to a consortium including the companies Alpha Partners, Wesfarmers and Glenvill Group.

On 25 October 2017, the new planning minister Richard Wynne announced the Boiler House would not receive a Heritage Overlay to "make way for new homes, parkland and open space". Plans for the development set out an estimated 2,500 townhouses and apartments, 13,000 m^{2} (140,000 sq ft) of retail space, affordable housing, community facilities and open space. The development was expected to house 5,000 new residents, doubling the suburb's population. The development, which was dubbed "Tesla town" due to its environmentally friendly approach, would include homes with solar panels, Tesla Powerwall solar batteries, electric vehicle chargers, and a six-star ESD rating from the Urban Development Institute of Australia. The developers also planned for a water-use reduction of 43% and an 80% landfill reduction.

== Incidents ==
In October 1927, Charles Butling, a 24-year-old foreman labourer at the mill, was crushed by three tons of equipment. He was taken to St Vincent's Hospital, Melbourne, but died upon arrival.

In June 1949, APM was charged with six counts of "having committed a nuisance by allowing smoke dust, and incompletely combusted material to issue from its chimneys" by the City of Heidelberg. The complaint arose after soot entered the homes of nearby residents. The incident was caused by a shortage of black coal.

In December 2007, Heidelberg Magistrates' Court convicted Amcor for releasing oil into the nearby Yarra River and fined it $80,000.

== See also ==
- Australian Paper
- APM Siding
- Chandler Highway
- List of paper mills
