= Japanese recycling symbols =

Japan has a system of recycling marks, recycling identification marks (リサイクル識別表示マーク), which indicate and classify recyclable materials.

They are similar to the resin identification codes, in that they have surrounding arrows, with text inside to indicate the type of material.

Rather than using the triangular recycling symbol for all materials, with differing text, the shape of the arrows also varies, which allows them to be distinguished at a glance. The marks themselves are sometimes known by shorthand names, such as pura māku (プラマーク; from "plastic mark").

aluminium

paper

recyclable plastic (プラマーク, pura māku)

steel

polyethylene terephthalate

nickel-cadmium battery

nickel metal hydride battery

lithium-ion battery

lead-acid battery

polyvinyl chloride

== See also ==
- Recycling symbol
- Green Dot (symbol)
- Recycling codes
