= Gary Anderson (designer) =

American architect (born 1947)

The Universal Recycling Symbol, here rendered with a black outline and green fill. Both filled and outline versions of the symbol are in use.

Outline version

Gary Dean Anderson (born 1947) is an American graphic designer and architect. He is best known as the designer of the recycling symbol, one of the most readily recognizable logos in the world.

Anderson's contribution to modern graphic design has been compared to those of early pioneering modernist graphic designers such as Herbert Bayer. His design for a symbol to embody the concept of recycling has been compared to iconic trademarks such as those for Coca-Cola and Nike. It has been called one of America's "most important design icons," it is one of the most recognizable graphic symbols in the world and has helped to encourage global recycling. In some countries, such as the UK, the symbol carries such implicit meaning that it requires government permission to be used. Although the symbol is the most widely known of his accomplishments, Anderson has also made important contributions in the areas of urban planning and urban development.

== Family background ==
Anderson was born in Honolulu, Hawaii, into a family with roots in rural Germany, France, Scandinavia, Nebraska, and the agricultural US Midwest. Midwestern forebears included members of the communal, utopian Icarian Movement as well as supporters of the populist progressive politics of William Jennings Bryan.

Anderson's father, Glen, left farming and became an electronics technician in the US Navy. As a result of his career in the military, he was re-stationed frequently to various locations throughout the Pacific Rim, resulting in long absences from the family during Gary's early childhood and in the family's relocating several times. Possibly as a result of the stress accompanying these unsettled circumstances, Gary's mother Florence was hospitalized on several occasions suffering from bipolar disorder, periodically leaving Gary and his two sisters in the care of various relatives in Nebraska.

In the late 1950s, the family ultimately settled in North Las Vegas, Nevada, where Glen had been stationed at Lake Mead Naval Base, engaged in work related to atomic research at the Nevada Test Site. In 1958, shortly after joining the electronics firm of EG&G, Glen died of complications possibly attributable to exposure to atomic radiation years before at the Bikini Atoll nuclear test site.

== Academic background ==
Anderson attended public schools and graduated from high school in the Las Vegas Valley.

In 1966, after completing one year in the engineering program at the University of Southern California, Anderson changed majors and enrolled in the USC School of Architecture, where he studied from 1966 to 1970. He relied on various scholarships — notably from the Graham Foundation, the Architectural Guild of Southern California, and the American Institute of Architects — to fund his tuition. He earned a bachelor of architecture degree, magna cum laude, in 1970, and a master of urban design degree one year later, in 1971.

In the 1960s and 1970s, the teaching philosophy of the USC College of Architecture and Fine Arts was influenced by the Illinois Institute of Technology (IIT) Institute of Design. The Dean of the USC College, Crombie Taylor, was the former acting Director of the IIT Institute of Design. Consequently, the College's architectural education, like that of IIT, was steeped in Modernism and in particular the Bauhaus aesthetic and the Bauhaus approach to integrating art, architecture, technology, and culture. This was evident in the work of the College's faculty, which included the building scientist, Konrad Wachsmann, and the designer of some Case Study Houses in Southern California, Pierre Koenig. Other faculty who influenced Anderson's design aesthetic were the graphic artist John Gilchrist, whose recommended reading included D'Arcy Thompson's book On Growth and Form. Other readings were from Ralph Knowles, who was an early advocate of environmentally-friendly design that prefigured more recent sustainable design and development, and Richard Berry, the urban planner and theorist who explored with his students the relationship between design and information theory.

Through the University's work-study program, Anderson worked as an assistant to Crombie Taylor, preparing an exhibit of the ornamentation of the early modernist architect Louis Sullivan that melded together aspects of both organic and geometric form. The curriculum at the College included numerous electives, and the administration permitted great latitude in the courses that students took. Anderson took numerous courses outside his major, including courses in sociology, economics, and business, and he returned to the USC engineering program to take a course in mathematical topology for non-mathematicians. In this last course, Anderson would have encountered the Möbius strip, as a fundamental concept in the study of topology, that would prove to be seminal in his subsequent contributions.

== Social and cultural influences ==
During this time the world outside the university was in tumult which was reflected by events on campus. The Watts Riots had raged just south of USC the summer before Anderson arrived, and he was briefly engaged with the South Central Neighborhood Design Center, an organization that had been set up to provide pro bono architectural services in distressed neighborhoods, as a means of furthering the cause of social justice. Three years previously, Rachel Carson had published Silent Spring, which implicated big business and industry in profiting from practices that caused irreparable environmental harm. US involvement in the Vietnam War had steadily increased since 1959, with the deployment of combat troops in 1965.

Partly in reaction to these and other events, a youth movement was forming that questioned the established patterns of human interaction that gave rise to such problems. Among the early manifestations of this movement was a commitment to nonviolence and pacifism. It engendered, as well, a renewed interest in the stylistic aspects of culture such as were evidenced during a previous youth movement in the late 19th and early 20th Century when the Jugendstil and Art Nouveau flourished in the applied and graphic arts. Another aspect of the youth subculture of the 1960s and 1970s was the recreational use of psychoactive substances and psychedelic drugs.

By the 1970s, the mixing of the youth subculture with concurrent political and social upheavals seemed to give rise to a violent counterculture that appeared to morph out of the previously peaceful youth movement. In 1968, the Tate/LaBianca murders were committed by the youthful Charles Manson Family, and in 1970, the 26-year-old civil rights activist Angela Davis was implicated (although ultimately found not guilty) in the murder of a superior court judge.

== Recycling design competition ==
In 1970, when Anderson was 23 years old and a student at the University of Southern California, the Container Corporation of America (CCA) released a poster that was widely distributed to colleges and universities in the United States. Under the direction of Walter Paepcke, the CCA had established itself as a leader in corporate graphics and design. The poster advertised a competition to design a graphic symbol which would be used on recycled paper products and which could recognize a commitment to environmental sensitivity on the part of any manufacture who was engaged in recycling. The winning symbol would be given over to the public domain. The competition was also to honor the first Earth Day, which was held that same year on April 22.

Anderson designed a symbol and submitted three variations of it to the competition. The alternatives actually represented Anderson's stepwise refinement of a basic idea involving three arrows – from a more elaborate design utilizing different tones and the word "recycle", to a simple black and white line drawing with no wording. Anderson has stated that it only took him a "day or two" to come up with the design. The arrows were planar, suggesting strips of paper, but they curved and bent back upon themselves as though captured in the midst of an industrial manufacturing process, and the three arrows taken together as a continuous band formed the topological figure known as a Möbius strip.

The 500 entries to the competition were judged by designers recognized as world leaders in graphics and industrial art, including Saul Bass, Herbert Bayer, James Miho, Herbert Pinzke, and Eliot Noyes. In 1970, the award was announced at the International Design Conference at Aspen (IDCA) under the auspices of the Aspen Institute. Anderson received a fellowship to attend the Conference, along with a US$2,500 scholarship (equivalent to $21,000 in 2025).

Anderson has said that his academic experiences and the spirit of the times were primary determinates of his design; but that violence stemming from the drug-infused political radicalization of the youth movement led him to strive for a graphic approach that, while acknowledging the fluid mysticism of underground psychedelic art associated with Haight-Ashbury, reflected restraint and balance, as well.

Anderson admitted that he did not recognize the importance of his recycling design until he noticed it on a recycling bin while in Amsterdam. At the time of designing the logo, he was not even a graphic designer, he was pursuing architecture. He would go on to state that it only took him "a day or two" to come up with the design. Anderson on to write that he made the logo by drawing the design in pencil then would proceed to trace back over the design with black ink. He went on to state that he came up with the idea of the recycling logo while watching paper being "fed" to a printer. Anderson would go on to pursue a career in urban planning as a result of his architecture passion.

Anderson has also identified more specific but diverse influences that include a variation on a popular nursery rhyme, an elementary school field trip to an industrial printing press, the Woolmark symbol, and the graphic art of M. C. Escher, which at the time of the design competition had only recently become widely accessible in the United States.

== Further work ==
Anderson used his US$2,500 in prize money (equivalent to $21,000 in 2025) to study for a year at the Stockholm University, Sweden, obtaining a diploma in social science from the Institute for English Speaking Students, a branch of the University that no longer exists. Returning from Sweden, Anderson was employed as a planner and architectural designer by Gruen Associates (formerly Victor Gruen Associates) in Los Angeles and David Jay Flood and Associates of Santa Monica, California, before moving east to accept a planning position at RTKL Associates in Baltimore. During his tenure there, he became a registered architect. Laid off from RTKL during a recession in the mid-1970s, Anderson found work in the Prince George's County (Maryland) Department of Community Development, and then in the Office of University Planning at the University of Maryland.

In 1978, Anderson accepted a position in the School of Architecture and Planning at King Faisal University (KFU) in Dammam, Saudi Arabia. At about the same time, he was accepted into the PhD program in Geography and Environmental Engineering at Johns Hopkins University. He spent the next seven years alternately engaged in teaching and research at KFU, where he ultimately became acting head of the Department of Urban and Regional Planning. He continued to work on his PhD at Hopkins, which was awarded in 1985 after he defended his thesis on socio-cultural aspects of the Eastern Province of Saudi Arabia that, in combination with the rise of the oil economy, determined patterns of urbanization there. While still at KFU, he worked with CH2M Hill to undertake a comprehensive socioeconomic survey, which was one of the first in Saudi Arabia.

Returning to Baltimore, Anderson was employed by STV Inc (previously Lyon Associates), an engineering, architecture, and planning firm, where he held various positions over a period of eighteen years, ultimately rising to the role of vice president in charge of federal planning projects. As a result of his work there, he was awarded the national Urbahn Prize for Architecture by the Society of American Military Engineers (SAME), a distinction which he shares with other notables such as Harold Adams, the retired CEO of RTKL. Anderson was also inducted in the Academy of Fellows of SAME.

Concurrent with his work in government-related planning, Anderson held an adjunct faculty position in the Edward St John Department of Real Estate (in the Carey Business School at Johns Hopkins). In this capacity, he taught courses and wrote on the role of design and planning in private sector development, and he became a member of the executive committee of the Urban Land Institute (ULI), Baltimore District Council.

In 2005. Anderson became a Fulbright Senior Specialist, and was invited by the Helsinki University of Technology to lecture and advise graduate students on their theses in the Faculty for Engineering and Architecture and the Centre for Urban and Regional Studies.

== Recognition ==
Because he had turned his attention to pursuits not directly related to graphic design following creation of the recycling symbol, and because he lived abroad for extended periods of time, Anderson was not always recognized as the designer of the recycling symbol. Following the original press releases and initial coverage in trade publications, the design was sometimes erroneously attributed to the head of the Container Corporation's graphics department. There may have been an attempt to have the symbol copyrighted, despite the entry rules for the original competition which would have prohibited this. Anderson stated that he did not know the impact of his design globally until he saw it on a recycling bin.

It was not until the 1990s that the connection between Anderson and the symbol began to be better established, with the publication of an article by Philip B. Meggs in the trade journal Print, which credited Anderson with the design and showed that Anderson's symbol represents a modern expression of Bauhaus principles, a view which was reinforced subsequently by Peder Anker.
