= Wishcycling =

Misuse of recycling facilities

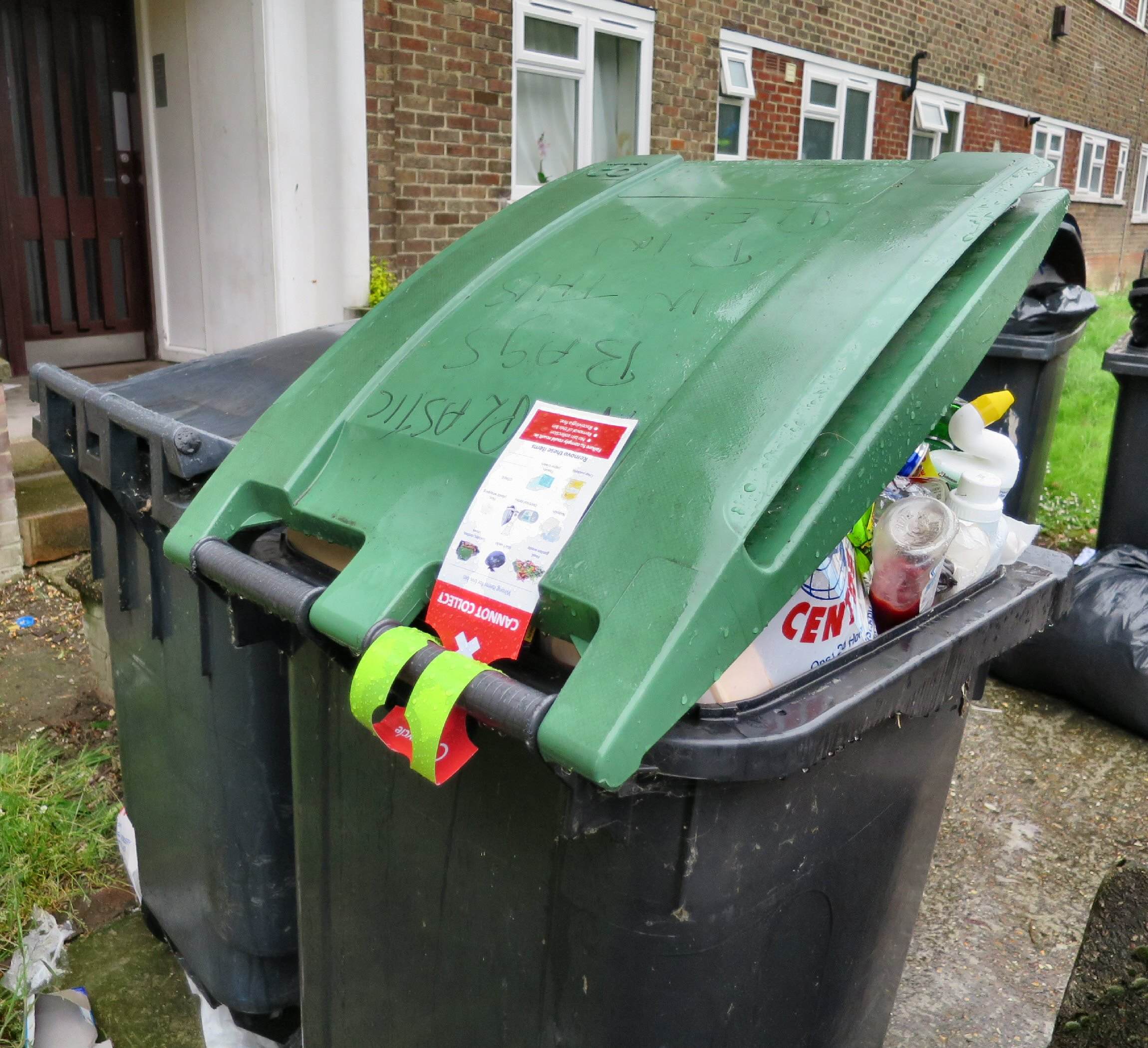
A tag on a recycle bin in London, England, informing the owner that the waste could not be collected due to inappropriate items being discarded in it

Wishcycling is the disposal of consumer waste in a recycling bin in hopes of it being recycled, when it cannot or is unlikely to be recycled. Wishcycling occurs because people are unfamiliar with what can be recycled or they believe the item they dispose of for recycling can be made into a useful item. Recycling programs differ by jurisdiction and accept different types of items, which can lead to confusion as to what types of items are accepted.

Wishcycling is a well-intentioned but misguided activity that can significantly disrupt the recycling process. Non-recyclable items introduced into the recycling stream can contaminate the otherwise recyclable materials. This contamination not only hinders the processing of genuine recyclables but in some cases, may lead to entire batches being deemed unrecyclable and subsequently sent to landfills. Nearly one-fifth of all recyclables are contaminated by wishcycling.

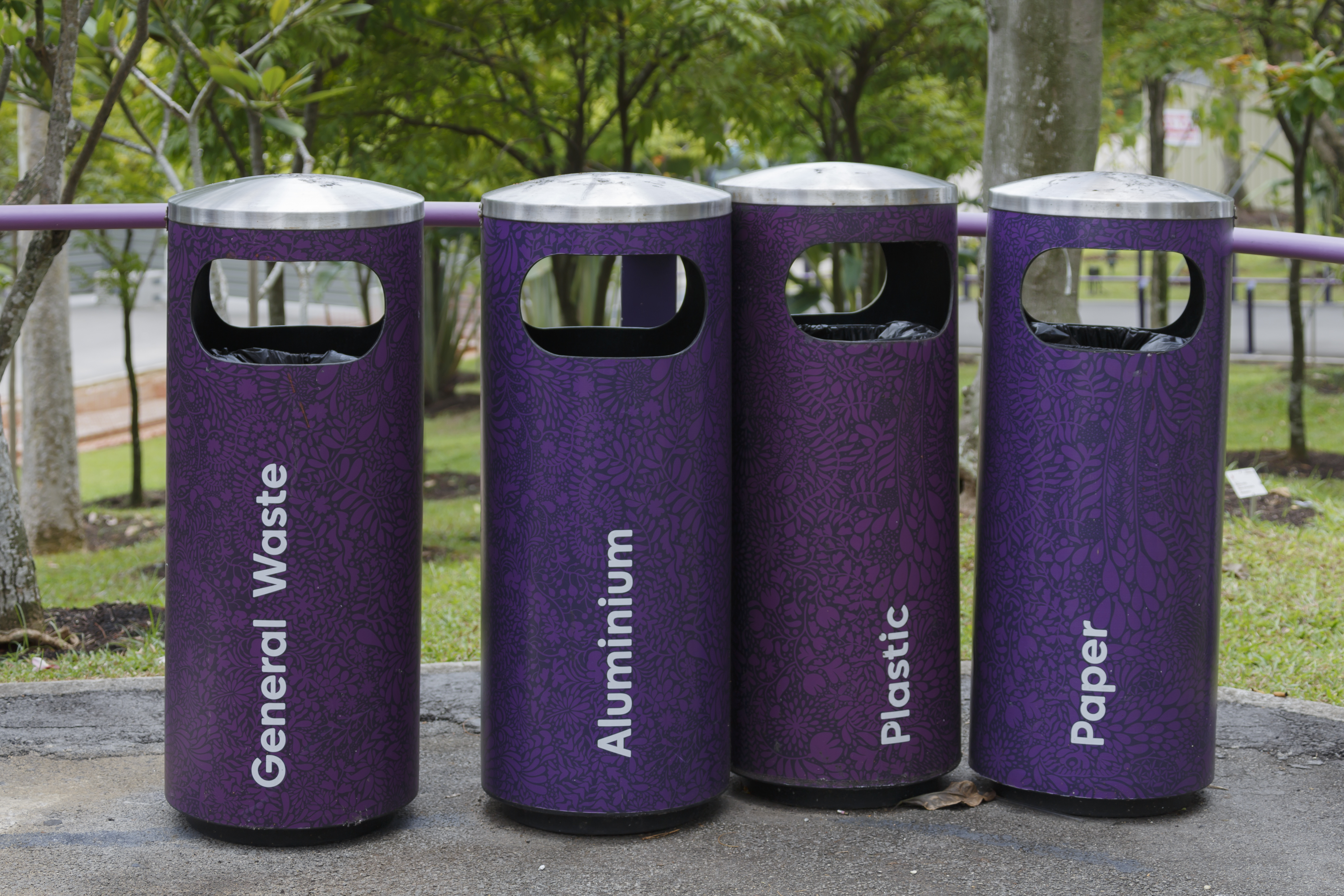
Straightforward sorting bins for recycling can help reduce wishcycling, highlighted here in Singapore.

This deterioration in the quality of recyclables undermines the efficiency and effectiveness of recycling efforts. The presence of non-recyclable items in the recycling stream imposes additional burdens on recycling facilities. Workers must expend extra time and effort to sort these items out, adding complexity to the recycling process. This added workload leads to increased operational costs, affecting the overall economic viability of recycling programs. Certain non-recyclable materials, such as plastic bags, hoses, or other items not designed for the recycling process, can cause damage to recycling machinery. This damage can result in costly repairs and downtime for recycling facilities, further exacerbating the challenges faced in the recycling process.

Commonly wishcycled objects include greasy pizza boxes, plastic shopping bags, Christmas trees, and styrofoam.

== See also ==
- Resin identification code
- Waste management
