= Container Corporation of America =

US corrugated box manufacturer

- Industry: Corrugated boxes
- Founded: 1926
- Fate: Acquired by Jefferson Smurfit Corporation

Container Corporation of America (CCA) was founded in 1926 and manufactured corrugated boxes. In 1968 CCA merged with Montgomery Ward & Company, Inc., becoming MARCOR. MARCOR maintained separate management for the operations of each company, but had a joint board of directors. In 1986, Mobil Corporation, which had bought MARCOR in the early 1970s, sold the CCA company to the Jefferson Smurfit Corporation, which merged with the Stone Container Corporation in 1998 to become part of the Smurfit-Stone Container Corporation.

Under the leadership of Walter Paepcke, CCA was a patron of graphic arts and design. The company amassed a collection of art works which eventually found their way to the National Museum of American Art.

In the late 1940s, CCA commissioned Herbert Bayer to create a World Geo-Graphic Atlas which was distributed free to more than 150 colleges and universities. A review described it as the "handsomest and best atlas ever published in America."

In the spring of 1970, CCA sponsored a contest to design a symbol to promote the recycling of paper products. The contest, which drew more than 500 submissions, was won by Gary Anderson, whose entry was the image now known as the universal recycling symbol.

The Container Corporation of America headquarters were located in Chicago, Illinois, in the United States.

== See also ==
- Descriptive Color Names Dictionary
