= Packaging and packaging waste directive =

1994 European Union directive

The European Union's packaging and packaging waste directive 94/62/EC (1994), adopted on 20 December 1994, deals with the problems of packaging waste and the currently permitted heavy metal content in packaging.

== Content ==
The directive obligates member states of the European Union (EU) to meet targets for the recovery and recycling of packaging waste. The directive covers all packaging placed on the market in the European Community, as the EU then was. Targets are set as a percentage of packaging flowing into the waste stream.

The directive:

- sets targets for recovery and plastic recycling
- requires the encouragement of the use of recycled packaging materials in the manufacturing of packaging and other products
- requires packaging to comply with 'essential requirements' which include the minimisation of packaging volume and weight, and the design of packaging to permit its reuse or recovery
- requires the implementation of measures to prevent packaging waste in addition to preventative measures under the 'essential requirements', which may include measures to encourage the re-use of packaging.

It was noted in the directive that European Community health, safety and transportation measures already applied to packaging, and the packaging directive was not intended to detract from those measures.

An earlier directive, 85/339/EC, was repealed by this measure.

== Transposition ==
Under EU law, directives need to be transposed into the domestic law of the member states of the EU. In the United Kingdom, prior to Brexit, articles 9 and 11 of the directive were implemented via the Packaging (Essential Requirements) Regulations 2003, although these were later replaced by the Packaging (Essential Requirements) Regulations 2015.

== Proposed regulation ==
In November 2022, the European Commission proposed an EU regulation to replace the directive, along with a communication to clarify the labels biobased, biodegradable, and compostable.

This new regulation came into force in February 2025. The Packaging and Packaging Waste Regulation mandates increased recycled content in plastic packs, clear labelling, the banning of certain materials and enhanced recyclability - as well as encouraging reuse and deposit return schemes.

== See also ==
- Extended producer responsibility (EPR)
- Green Dot (symbol)
- VerpackG, German Packaging Act / German EPR law
