= Ralph Knowles =

American lawyer

Ralph Knowles (born 1945 in Huntsville, Alabama, Died May 17, 2016 at his home in Atlanta, Georgia) was a class action attorney, best known for winning the Dow Corning breast implant case with damages of $4+ billion.

He earned a BA at the University of Alabama in 1966 and JD at the University of Alabama Law School in 1969. He worked as an attorney with the Atlanta law firm of Doffermyre Shields Canfield Knowles & Devine since 1991. Before this employment he was a longtime partner with Drake, Knowles & Pierce in Tuscaloosa, Alabama.

Knowles served on the board of directors of Legal Momentum (formerly the NOW Legal Defense and Education Fund). He also served on the national board of directors of the American Civil Liberties Union.

== Family ==
His brother Craig Knowles (deceased 1968) founded the Alabama Republican Party in the 1960s.

== External resources ==
- Bio
