= Berry Global =

Plastic packaging manufacturer

Berry Global Group, Inc.
- Formerly: Berry Plastics Group, Inc.
- Type: Public
- Traded as: NYSE: BERY
- Founded: 1967; 59 years ago
- Defunct: April 30, 2025; 17 months ago
- Fate: Acquired by Amcor
- Headquarters: Evansville, Indiana, U.S.
- Key people: Kevin Kwilinski (CEO)
- Revenue: ▲US$13 Billion (FY 2018)
- Operating income: ▲US$581 million (FY 2016)
- Owner: Amcor
- Number of employees: 48,000 (2019)
- Parent: Amcor
- Website: www.berryglobal.com

Berry Global Group, Inc. was a Fortune 500 global manufacturer and marketer of plastic packaging products. Headquartered in Evansville, Indiana, it had over 265 facilities across the globe and more than 46,000 employees

With $14+ billion in revenues in fiscal year 2022, the company was one of the largest Indiana headquartered company in Fortune Magazine’s ranking. The company changed its name from Berry Plastics to Berry Global in 2017.

The company had three core divisions: (1) Health, Hygiene, and Specialties; (2) Consumer Packaging; and (3) Engineered Materials. Berry claimed to be the world's leader in manufactured aerosol caps, and also provided one of the most extensive lines of container products. Berry had more than 2,500 clients, including firms as Sherwin-Williams, Borden, McDonald's, Burger King, Gillette, Procter & Gamble, Pepsi, Nestle, Coca-Cola, Wal-Mart, Kmart, and Hershey Foods.

Berry Global was purchased by Amcor on 30 April 2025, where it was delisted from the New York Stock Exchange.

== History ==
In Evansville, Indiana, a company named Imperial Plastics was founded in 1967. In the beginning the plant employed three workers and produced aerosol caps using one injection molding machine (in 2017 more than 2400 employees worked for Berry Global in Evansville). The company was purchased by Jack Berry Sr. in 1983. In 1987 the company made its first expansion outside Evansville, opening its second plant, in Henderson, Nevada.

In recent years, Berry has completed several acquisitions including Mammoth Containers, Sterling Products, Tri-Plas, Alpha Products, PackerWare, Venture Packaging, Virginia Design Packaging, Container Industries, Knight Engineering and Plastics, Cardinal Packaging, Poly-Seal, Landis Plastics, Euromex Plastics S.A. de C.V., Kerr Group, Covalence Specialty Materials,(the former Tyco Plastics & Adhesives business), Rollpak, Captive Plastics, MAC Closures, Superfos, and the Pliant Corporation.

Landis Plastics, Inc. was based in Chicago Ridge, Illinois, with five domestic facilities supporting North American customers, manufacturing injection molded and thermoformed plastic packaging for dairy and other food products. Landis had experienced robust organic sales growth of 10.4%(1) over its last 15 years, before its purchase by Berry Plastics in 2003. During 2002, Landis generated $211.6 million of net sales.

In September 2011, Berry Plastics acquired 100% of the capital stock of Rexam SBC for an aggregate purchase price of $351 million ($340 million, net of cash acquired), financing the purchase with cash on hand and existing credit facilities. Rexam produces rigid packaging, notably plastic closures, fitments and dispensing closure systems, and jars. The acquisition was accounted for under the purchase method of accounting, accordingly allocating the purchase price to the identifiable assets and liabilities based on estimated fair values at the acquisition date. In July 2015, Berry announced plans to acquire Charlotte, North Carolina–based AVINTIV for $2.45 billion cash.

In August 2016, Berry Global acquired AEP Industries for $765 million.

In April 2017, the company announced that it was changing its name to Berry Global Group, Inc. In November 2017, Berry announced it had acquired Clopay Plastic Products Company, Inc. for $475 million. In August 2018, Berry Global acquired Laddawn for an undisclosed amount. In July 2019, Berry Global acquired RPC Group for $6.5 billion. Berry's combined global footprint will consist of over 290 locations worldwide, including locations in North and South America, Europe, Asia, Africa, and Australia, and Russia. The pro forma combined business will employ over 48,000 people across six continents with sales of approximately $13 billion based on the latest published financial statements of Berry and RPC.

In February 2024, Berry Global merged its Health, Hygiene and Specialties side of the company with Glatfelter Corporation.

In November 2024, Amcor entered into an agreement to acquire Berry Global for US$8.43 billion in stock. The deal was closed on April 30, 2025
