= Period-after-opening symbol =

Symbol often found on cosmetic products

The period-after-opening symbol or PAO symbol is a graphic symbol that identifies the useful lifetime of a cosmetic product after its package has been opened for the first time. It depicts an open cosmetics pot and is used together with a written number of months or years.

In the European Union, cosmetics products with a shelf life of at least 30 months are not required to carry a "best used before end of ..." date. Instead, there has to be "an indication of the period of time after opening for which the product can be used without any harm to the consumer". The EU Cosmetics Directive defines in Annex VIIIa the language-neutral open-jar symbol, which manufacturers should use to indicate this period.

The time period is most often represented compactly as a number of months, followed by the letter "M", as in "36M" or "36 M" for a period of 36 months, written either onto the front side of the depicted pot or to the right or bottom of it. The letter "M" is the initial for the word month not only in English, but also in Latin and many other European languages. It is also used in the ISO 8601 duration notation.

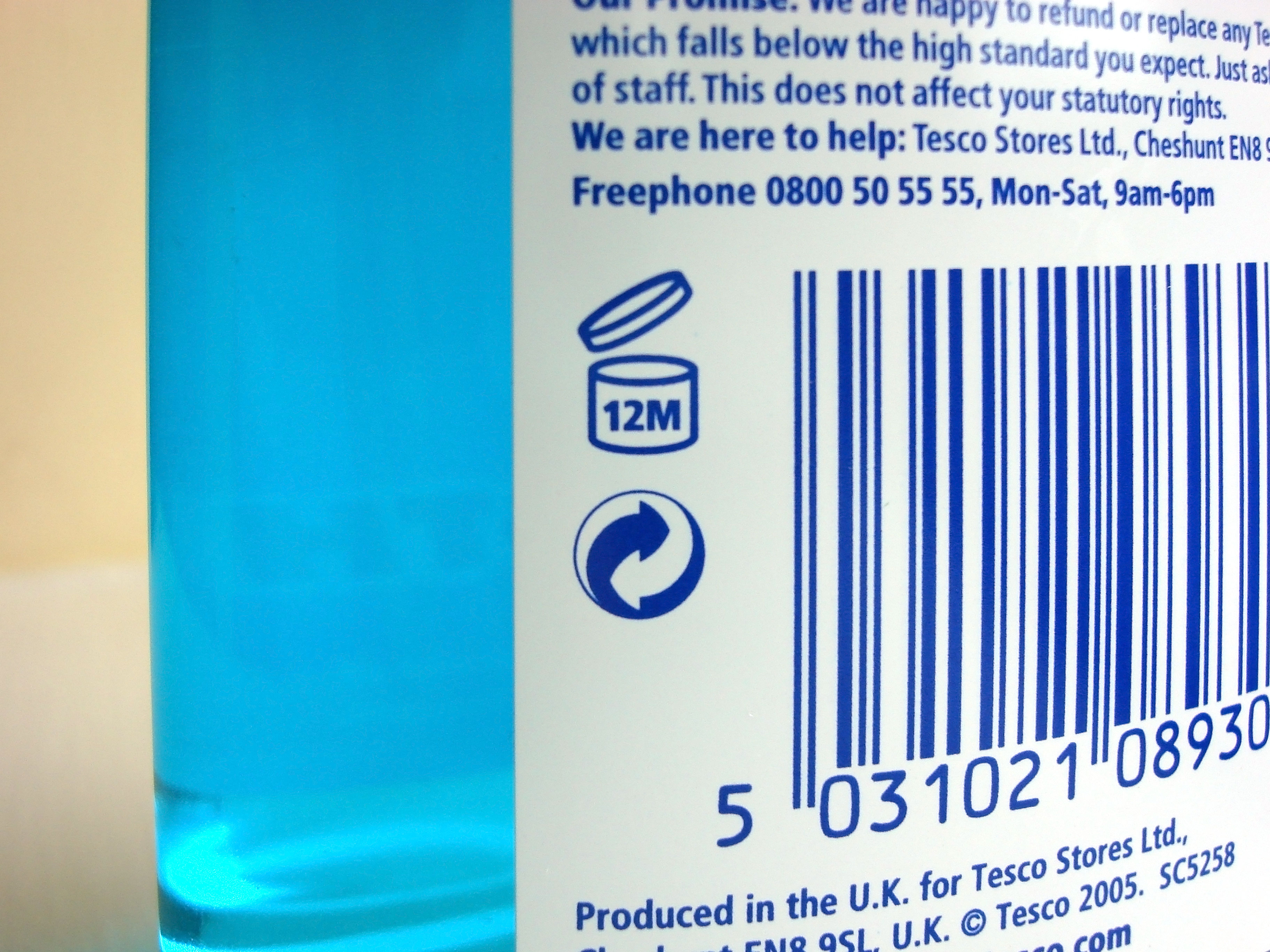
PAO symbol on a bottle of mouthwash

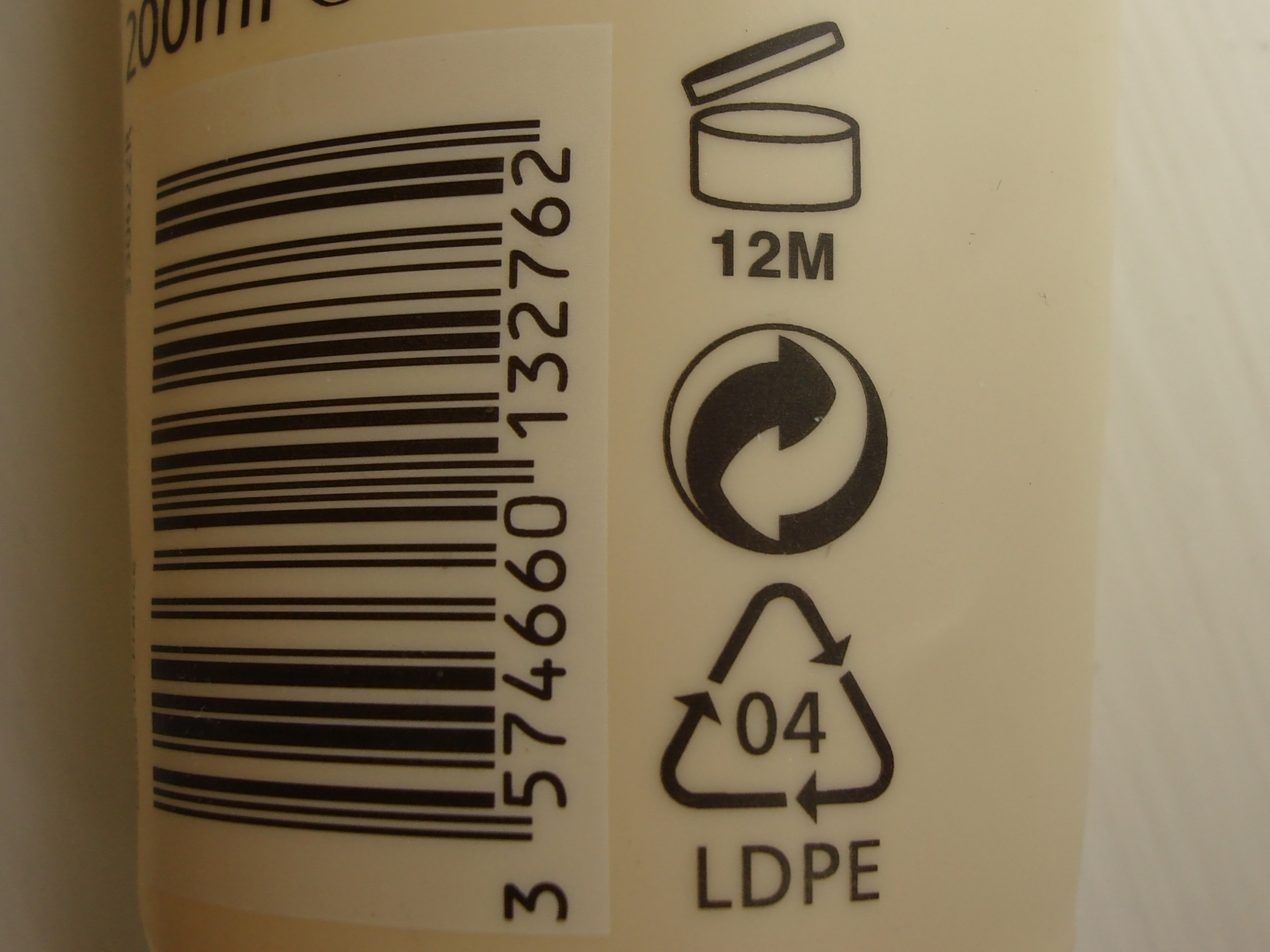
PAO symbol, along with the Green Dot symbol and resin identification code on a bottle of lotion.

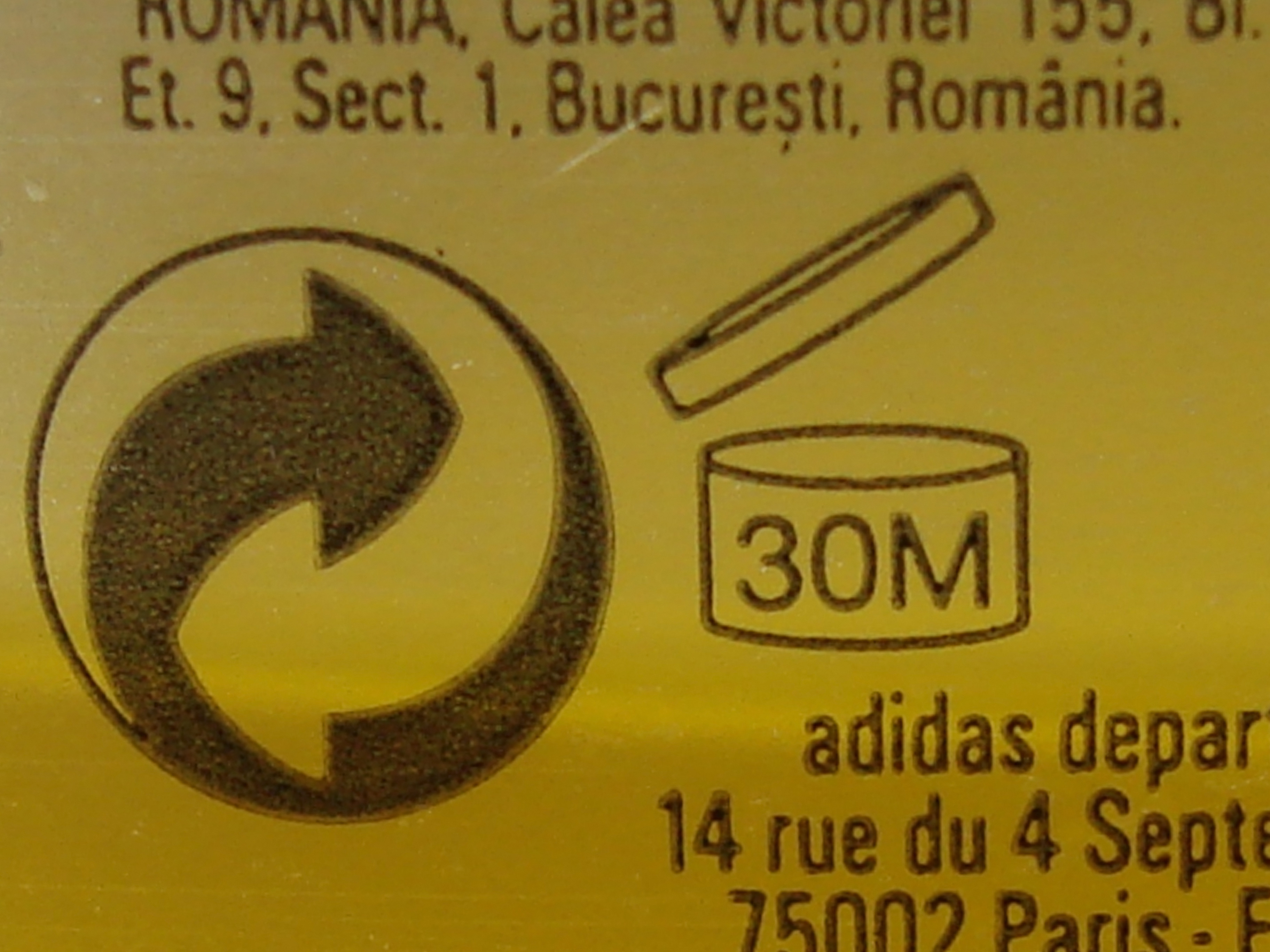
PAO symbol on a bottle of shower gel.
