= Resin identification code =

Symbol to identify the type of plastic

Resin Identification Code
- Standard Practice for Coding Plastic Manufactured Articles for Resin Identification
- Year started: 1988
- Latest version: ASTM D7611/D7611M-26; 24 July 2026
- Organization: Society of the Plastics Industry (1988–2008); ASTM International (2008–present)
- Website: D7611/D7611M-26

A resin identification code (RIC) is a symbol embedded on plastic products, used to sort plastic waste for recycling. They consist of an equilateral triangle with a number inside indicating the product's resin content. These symbols were created in 1988 by the Plastics Industry Association in the United States, amid growing concerns about plastic pollution. Since 2008, they are administrated by the ASTM and comprise the technical standard D7611/D7611M-26 "Standard Practice for Coding Plastic Manufactured Articles for Resin Identification". The European Commission Decision 97/129/EC "Identification System For Packaging Materials" extends this system with recycling codes for other materials like batteries, paper, and glass.

Despite their similarity to the recycling symbol, resin codes do not indicate whether a product is recyclable. They are frequently misinterpreted by consumers, and contribute to wishcycling (the contamination of recycling bins with unrecyclable goods). At the US Environmental Protection Agency's recommendation, a 2013 revision to the ASTM standard replaced the "chasing arrows" with a solid equilateral triangle, but the old symbols are still widely used among manufacturers.

== History ==
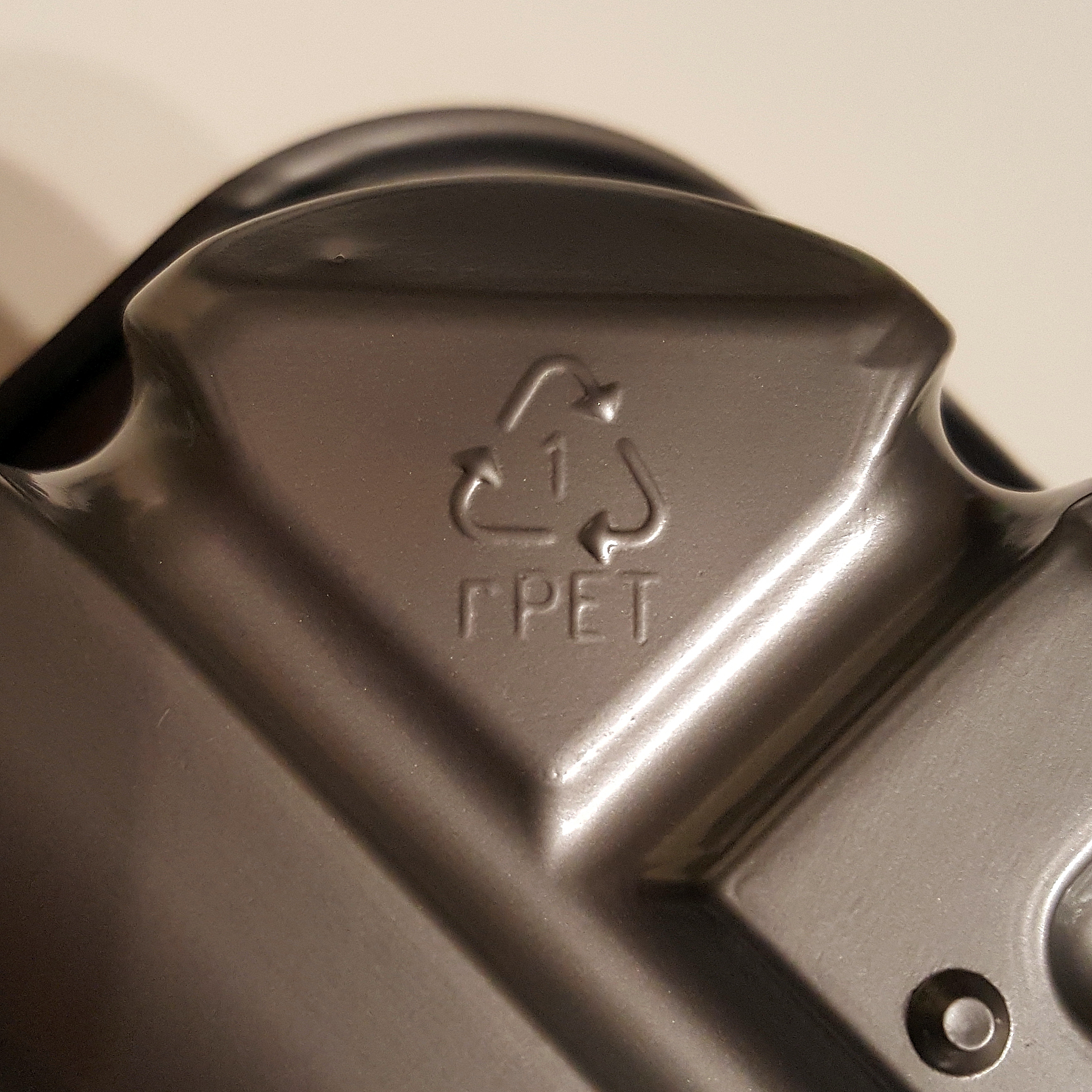
A plastic tray made from recycled polyethylene terephthalate, bearing the resin identification code 1 on its base

The Society of the Plastics Industry (SPI) first introduced the system in 1988 as the "Voluntary Plastic Container Coding System". The SPI stated that one purpose of the original SPI code was to "Provide a consistent national system to facilitate recycling of post-consumer plastics." The system has been adopted by a growing number of communities implementing recycling programs, as a tool to assist in sorting plastics. To deal with the concerns of recyclers across the U.S., the RIC system was designed to make it easier for workers in materials recovery and recycling facilities to sort and separate items according to their resin type. Plastics must be recycled separately, with other like materials, to preserve the value of the recycled material, and enable its reuse in other products after being recycled.

When a number is omitted, the arrows arranged in a triangle resemble the universal recycling symbol, a generic indicator of recyclability. Subsequent revisions to the RIC have replaced the arrows with a solid equilateral triangle, to address consumer confusion about the meaning of the RIC, and the fact that the presence of a RIC symbol on an item does not necessarily indicate that it is recyclable any more than its absence means the plastic object is necessarily unrecyclable.

In 2008, ASTM International took over the administration of the RIC system and issued ASTM D7611—Standard Practice for Coding Plastic Manufactured Articles for Resin Identification. In 2013, this standard was revised to change the graphic marking symbol of the RIC from the "chasing arrows" of the Recycling Symbol to a solid triangle instead.

In the United States and Canada, the Sustainable Packaging Coalition created in 2008 a project called the "How2Recycle" label. The project has expanded to 525 brands utilizing the label in 2023. The How2Recycle label is an effort to remove guesswork out of recycling by instructing consumers how to recycle the packaging of a product and describing which parts can be recycled. The labels also encourage consumers to check with local facilities to see which plastics each municipal recycling facility can accept.

== Unicode ==
The different resin identification codes are part of the Unicode block called Miscellaneous Symbols and have the following codes: ♳ (U+2673), ♴ (U+2674), ♵ (U+2675), ♶ (U+2676), ♷ (U+2677), ♸ (U+2678), and ♹ (U+2679). ♺ (U+267A). These emoji were added as a part of Unicode version 3.2 in 2002.

== Criticism ==
In the United States, use of the RIC in the coding of plastics has led to consumer confusion about which plastic products are accepted for recycling. When many plastics recycling programs were first being implemented in communities across the United States, only plastics with RICs "1" and "2" (polyethylene terephthalate and high-density polyethylene, respectively) were accepted. The list of acceptable plastic items has grown since then. Some communities also instruct residents to consider the form of packaging (i.e. bottles, tubs, lids, etc.) when determining what to include in a curbside recycling bin, rather than relying on the RIC. To further alleviate consumer confusion, the American Chemistry Council launched the "Recycling Terms & Tools" program to promote standardized language that can be used to educate consumers about how to recycle plastic products.

Although it can be technically possible to recycle a particular type of plastic, it is often not economically feasible to do so, and that can mislead consumers into thinking that more plastic is recycled than really is. In the U.S., it was estimated only 8.5% of plastic waste was recycled in 2018.

== See also ==
- List of symbols
- Recycling codes
- Plastic recycling
- Thermoplastic—softens with heat
- Thermosetting polymer—does not soften with heat
