= Recycling codes =

Code identifying material, for recycling

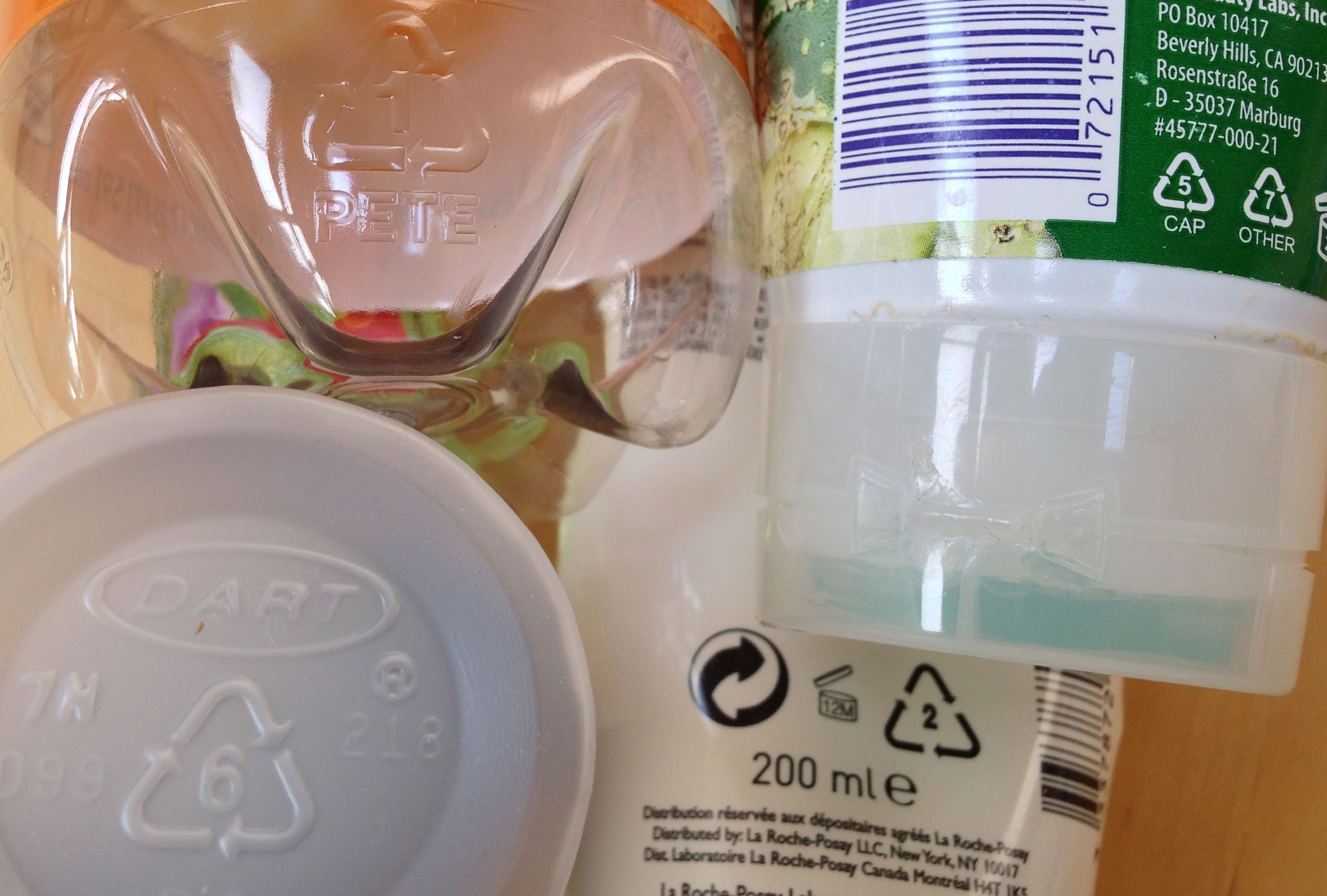
Recycling codes on products

Recycling codes are used to identify the materials out of which the item is made, to facilitate easier recycling process. The presence on an item of a recycling code, a chasing arrows logo, or a resin code, is not an automatic indicator that a material is recyclable; it is an explanation of what the item is made of. Codes have been developed for batteries, biomatter/organic material, glass, metals, paper, and plastics. Various countries have adopted different codes. For example, the table below shows the polymer resin (plastic) codes. In the United States there are fewer, because ABS is placed with "others" in group 7.

A number of countries have a finer-grained system with more recycling codes. For example, China's polymer identification system has seven different classifications of plastic, five different symbols for post-consumer paths, and 140 identification codes. The lack of a code system in some countries has encouraged those who fabricate their own plastic products, such as RepRap and other prosumer 3D printer users, to adopt a voluntary recycling code based on the more comprehensive Chinese system.

== Resin identification codes and codes defined by the European Commission ==
Symbol (Note: For the resin codes, ASTM International has replaced the three-arrow symbol by a solid, equilateral triangle because "the code is designed for resin-identification purposes and not recyclability". The three-arrow symbol was based on the Universal Recycling Symbol and is still in widespread use.)	Code	Description	Examples
Plastics (see resin identification code)
	1 PET(E)	Polyethylene terephthalate	Polyester fibers, soft drink bottles, food containers (also see plastic bottles)
	2 PEHD or HDPE	High-density polyethylene	Plastic milk containers, plastic bags, bottle caps, trash cans, oil cans, plastic lumber, toolboxes, supplement containers
	3 PVC or V	Polyvinyl chloride	Window frames, bottles for chemicals, flooring, plumbing pipes, phonograph records (vinyl records)
	4 PELD or LDPE	Low-density polyethylene	Plastic bags, Ziploc bags, buckets, squeeze bottles, plastic tubes, cutting boards
	5 PP	Polypropylene	Flower pots, bumpers, car interior trim, industrial fibers, carry-out beverage cups, microwavable food containers, DVD keep cases
	6 PS	Polystyrene	Toys, video cassettes, ashtrays, trunks, beverage/food coolers, beer cups, wine and champagne cups, carry-out food containers, Styrofoam
	7 O (Other)	All other plastics	Polycarbonate (PC), polyamide (PA), styrene acrylonitrile (SAN), acrylic plastics/polyacrylonitrile (PAN), bioplastics
	ABS	Acrylonitrile butadiene styrene	Monitor/TV cases, coffee makers, cell phones, calculators, most computer plastic, Lego bricks, most FFF 3D printed parts that are not bioplastic such as PLA
	PA	Polyamide (nylon)	Toothbrush bristles, socks, stockings, automobile seatbelts, backpacks, parachutes, kites
Batteries (see also battery recycling)
	8 Lead	Lead–acid battery	Car batteries, truck and semi truck batteries, buses and coaches, boats and jet skis, jump starters, data centers
	9 Alkaline	Alkaline battery	TV Remote batteries, flashlight batteries
	10 NiCD	Nickel–cadmium battery	Older batteries; camcorders, walkie-talkies and two-way radios, RC cars, rechargeable razors
	11 NiMH	Nickel–metal hydride battery	Rechargeable AA/AAA batteries, cordless phone batteries, older hybrid car batteries (Toyota Prius), power tool battery packs
	12 Li	Lithium battery	Cell phone batteries, computer batteries, camera batteries, e-cigarettes
	13 SO(Z)	Silver-oxide battery	Wristwatches, small medical devices (hearing aids), precision laser pointers, digital thermometers
	14 CZ	Zinc–carbon battery	Flashlight batteries, clocks, smoke detectors
Paper
	20 PAP	Corrugated fiberboard (cardboard)	Cardboard boxes, eg. shipping, food delivery
	21 PAP	Non-corrugated fiberboard (paperboard)	Cereal boxes, cracker boxes, tissue boxes, medicine boxes, greeting cards
	22 PAP	Paper	Newspaper, books, magazines, wrapping paper, wallpaper, paper bags, paper straws
Metals
	40 FE	Steel	Food cans (soup, beans), coffee tins, bottle caps, aerosol cans, paint cans, electronic casing such as USB shields
41-ALU	41 ALU	Aluminium	Soft drink cans, deodorant cans, disposable food containers, aluminium foil, heat sinks
Biomatter/Organic material
	50 FOR	Wood	Furniture, cutting boards, brooms, pencils, cocktail sticks, wooden spoons
	51 FOR	Cork	Bottle stoppers, place mats, construction material
	60 COT	Cotton	Towels, t-shirts, cotton buds/swabs, cotton pads
	61 TEX	Jute	Burlap sacks, twine/rope, carpet backing, "Hessian" fabric, reusable grocery bags
	62-69 TEX	Other textiles	Summer shirts, high-end bed sheets, tablecloths, tea towels. Heavy-duty canvas bags, sustainable clothing, rope, industrial twine. Sweaters (Jumpers), winter coats, suits, blankets, carpets. Ties, high-end dresses, scarves, luxury bedding. Polyester, Nylon, Spandex, "Poly-cotton" blends, microfiber cloths.
Glass
	70 GL	Clear Glass	Food storage jars such as spirit bottles, soda bottles
	71 GL	Green Glass	Wine bottles and spirits, carafes
	72 GL	Brown Glass	Beer, light-sensitive products, ink bottles, photo developer
	73 GL	Dark Sort Glass	Wine bottles, sparkling water bottles, champagne bottles, high-end olive oil
	74 GL	Light Sort Glass	Voss water, Light-blue perfume bottles
	75 GL	Light Leaded Glass	Televisions, high-end electronics display glass like in calculators
	76 GL	Leaded Glass	Older televisions, ash trays, older beverage holders
	77 GL	Copper Mixed/Copper Backed Glass	Electronics, LCD heads, clocks, watches
	78 GL	Silver Mixed/Silver Backed Glass	Mirrors, formal table settings
	79 GL	Gold Mixed/Gold Backed Glass	Computer glass, formal table settings
Composites (80—99)
	80 Paper	Paper and miscellaneous metals	Insulated Mailing Envelopes
	81 PapPet	Paper + plastic	Consumer packaging, pet food bags, cold store grocery bags, ice cream containers, cardboard cans, disposable plates
	82 C/PAP	Paper and fibreboard/Aluminium	Butter & margarine wrappers, chewing gum foil, cigarette inner liners, soup/sauce sachets, candy bar wraps
	83 C/PAP	Paper and fibreboard/Tinplate	Composite cans (e.g., cocoa powder, infant formula), high-end tea canisters, heavy-duty mailing tubes, luxury gift tubes (whisky/perfume)
	84 C/PAP (or PapAl)	Paper and cardboard/plastic/aluminium	Liquid storage containers, juice boxes, cardboard cans, cigarette pack liners, gum wrappers, cartridge shells for blanks, fireworks colouring material, Tetra Brik.
	85 C/PAP	Paper and fibreboard/Plastic/Aluminium/Tinplate	Large industrial canisters or specific heavy-duty dry food storage
	87 CSL (Card-Stock Laminate)	Biodegradable plastic	Laminating material, special occasion cards, bookmarks, business cards, flyers/advertising
	90 C/LDPE	Plastics/Aluminium	Plastic toothpaste tubes/some vacuum packed coffee bags
	91 C/LDPE	Plastic/Tinplate	Laminated wet-wipe canisters, industrial grease tubs
	92 C/LDPE	Plastic/Miscellaneous metals	Anti-static electronics bags, specialized vacuum-sealed industrial parts
	95 C/GL	Glass/Plastic	Safety-coated laboratory bottles, aerosol perfume glass, shatter-proof cosmetic jars
	96 C/GL	Glass/Aluminium	Pharmaceutical vials with crimped caps, premium spirits bottles with metal sleeves
	97 C/GL	Glass/Tinplate	Decorative food jars, high-end candle jars, vintage-style apothecary bottles, heavy-duty storage canisters
	98 C/GL	Glass/Miscellaneous metals	Vacuum-insulated glass panels, high-end laboratory electronics, specialized optical lenses
	99	other	Solar panels, high-tech vacuum packaging, specialized military "MRE" pouches, heavy-duty electronics shielding

== Chinese codes for plastics products ==
The Standardization Administration of the People's Republic of China (SAC) has defined material codes for different types of plastics in the document GB 16288-2008. The numbers are consistent with RIC up to #6.

Code	Abbreviation	Name
1	PET	polyethylene terephthalate
2	HDPE	polyethylene, high density
3	PVC	poly(vinyl chloride)
4	LDPE	polyethylene, low density
5	PP	polypropylene
6	PS	polystyrene
7	AB	Acrylonitrile-butadiene plastic
8	ABAK	Acrylonitrile-butadiene-acrylate plastic
9	ABS	Acrylonitrile-butadiene-styrene plastic
10	ACS	Acrylonitrile-chlorinated polyethylene-styrene
11	AEPDS	Acrylonitrile-(ethylene-propylene-diene)-styrene plastic
12	AMMA	Acrylonitrile-methyl-methacrylate plastic
13	ASA	Acrylonitrile styrene acrylate plastic
14	CA	cellulose acetate
15	CAB	cellulose acetate butyrate
16	CAP	cellulose acetate propionate
17	CEF	cellulose formaldehyde
18	CF	cellulose-formaldehyde resin
19	CMC	carboxymethyl cellulose
20	CN	cellulose nitrate
21	COC	cycloolefin copolymer
22	CP	cellulose propionate
23	CTA	cellulose triacetate
24	E/P	Ethylene-propylene plastic
25	EAA	Ethylene-acrylic acid plastic
26	EBAK	Ethylene-butyl acrylate plastic
27	EC	ethyl cellulose
28	EEAK	Ethylene-ethyl acrylate plastic
29	EMA	Ethylene-methacrylic acid plastic
30	EP	epoxide; epoxy resin or plastic
31	ETFE	Ethylene-tetrafluoroethylene plastic
32	EVA	Ethylene-vinyl acetate plastic
33	EVOH	Ethylene-vinyl alcohol plastic
34	FEP	perfluoro (ethylene-propylene) plastic
35	FF	Furan-formaldehyde resin
36	LCP	Liquid-crystal polymer
37	MABS	methyl methacrylate-acrylnitrile-butadiene-styrene plastic
38	MBS	methyl methacrylate-butadiene-styrene plastic
39	MC	methyl cellulose
40	MF	Melamine-formaldahyde resin
41	MP	Melamine-phenol resin
42	MSAN	α-methylstyrene-acrylonitrile plastic
43	PA	polyamide
44	PAA	poly(acrylic acid)
45	PAEK	polyaryletherketone
46	PAI	polyamidimide
47	PAK	polyacrylate
48	PAN	polyacrylonitrile
49	PAR	polyarylate
50	PARA	poly(aryl amide)
51	PB	polybutene
52	PBAK	poly(butyl acrylate)
53	PBAT	poly(butylene adipate/terephthalate)
54	PBD	1,2-polybutadiene
55	PBN	poly(butylene napthalate)
56	PBS	polybuthylenesuccinate
57	PBT	poly(butylene terephthalate)
58	PC	polycarbonate
59	PCCE	poly(cyclohexylene dimethylene cyclohexanedicarboxylate)
60	PCL	polycaprolactone
61	PCT	poly(cyclonhexylene dimethylene terephthalate)
62	PCTFE	polychlorotrifluoroethylene
63	PDAP	poly(diallyl phthalate)
64	PDCPD	polydiclopentadiene
65	PEC	polyester carbonate or poly(butylene succinate/carbonate)
66	PEC	polyestercarbonate
67	PE-C	polyethylene, chlorinated
68	PEEK	polyetheretherketone
69	PEEST	polyetherester
70	PEI	polyetherimide
71	PEK	polyetherketone
72	LLDPE	polyethylene, linear low density
73	MDPE	polyethylene, medium density
74	PEN	poly(ethylene naphthalate)
75	PEOX	poly(ethylene oxide)
76	PES	poly(ethylene succinate)
77	PESTUR	polyesterurethane
78	PESU	polyethersulfone
79	UHMWPE	polyethylene, ultra high molecular weight
80	PEUR	polyetherurethane
81	VLDPE	polyethylene, very low density
82	PF	Phenol-formaldehyde resin
83	PFA	Perfluoro alkoxyl alkane resin
84	PGA	poly(glycolic acid)
85	PHA	polyhydroxyalanoic or polyhydroxyalkanoates
86	PHB	polyhydroxybutyric acid or polyhydroxybutyrate
87	PHBV	poly-(hydroxybutyrate-co-hydroxyvalerate)
88	PI	polyimide
89	PIB	polyisobutylene
90	PIR	polyisocyanurate
91	PK	polyketone
92	PLA	polylactic acid or poly lactide
93	PMI	polymethacrylimide
94	PMMA	poly(methyl methacrylate)
95	PMMI	Poly-N-methylmethacrylimide
96	PMP	poly-4-methylpenten-1
97	PMS	Poly-α-methylstyrene
98	POM	polyoxymethylene; polyacetal; polyformaldehyde
99	PPC	carbon dioxide and propylene copolymer
100	PPDO	Poly(p-dioxanone)
101	PPE	poly(phenylene ether)
102	PP-E	polypropylene, expandable
103	PP-HI	polypropylene, high impact
104	PPOX	poly(propylene oxide)
105	PPS	poly(phenylene sulfide)
106	PPSU	poly(phenylene sulfone)
107	EPS	polystyrene, expandable
108	HIPS	polystyrene, high impact
109	PSU	polysulfone
110	PTFE	poly tetrafluoroethylene
111	PTMAT	poly(tetramethylene adipate/terephthalate)
112	PTT	poly(trimethylene terephthalene)
113	PUR	polyurethane
114	PVA	poly(vinyl acetate)
115	PVOH	poly(vinyl alcohol)
116	PVB	poly(vinyl butyral)
117	PVC-C	poly(vinyl chloride), chlorinated
118	PVC-U	poly(vinyl chloride), unplasticized
119	PVDC	poly(vinylidene chloride)
120	PVDF	poly(vinylidene fluoride)
121	PVF	poly(vinyl fluoride)
122	PVFM	poly(vinyl formal)
123	PVK	Poly-N-vinylcarbazole
124	PVP	Poly-N-vinylpyrrolidine
125	SAN	Styrene-acrylonitrile plastic
126	SB	Styrene-butadiene plastic
127	SI	silicone plastic
128	SMAH	Styrene-maleic anyhydride plastic
129	SMS	Styrene-α-methylstyrene plastic
130	UF	Urea-formaldehyde resin
131	UP	unsaturated polyester resin
132	VCE	vinyl chloride-ethylene plastic
133	VCEMAK	vinyl chloride-ethylene-methyle-acrylate plastic
134	VCEVAC	vinyl chloride-ethylene-vinyl acrylate plastic
135	VCMAK	vinyl chloride-methyl acrylate plastic
136	VCMMA	vinyl chloride-methyl methacrylate plastic
137	VCOAK	vinyl chloride-octyl acrylate plastic
138	VCVAC	vinyl chloride-vinyl acetate plastic
139	VCVDC	vinyl chloride-vinylidene chloride plastic
140	VE	vinyl ester resin

== Alternative recycling labels ==
The following recycling label projects are designed with the consumer in mind while SPI or Resin Identification Codes are designed to be recognized by waste sorting facilities. They provide an alternative that eliminates confusion as people often mistake any resin code to be recyclable, but this is not necessarily true. The recyclability of the numbers depends on the abilities of the facilities in the community. Thus, they are not all automatically recyclable.

How2Recycle is a project that started in 2008. The label provides information about the packaging material and clearly indicates whether it is recyclable, partially or totally. If it is not recyclable at all, it is shown by a diagonal line going through the recycling label.

OPRL is a not-for-profit organisation that provides simple, consistent 'recycle' & 'refill' labels for retailer & brand packaging in the UK market. The labels clearly state whether the packaging is recyclable or not, helping consumers recycle better, more often.

== See also ==
- Resin identification code
- Japanese recycling symbols
- Waste hierarchy
- Waste management
- Food safe symbol
- Bag It (documentary)
