= Plastics Industry Association =

American organization

- Formation: 1937
- Headquarters: Washington, DC
- Key people: Matt Seaholm (CEO)
- Website: plasticsindustry.org

Plastics Industry Association, until 2016 Society of the Plastics Industry (SPI), is a trade association of the plastics industry. It was founded in 1937.

The organization was in charge of many new laws that pass the mandate of all plastics to be uniformed with a special resin code. This code closely resembles the recycling symbol which includes three chasing arrows in a triangular shape. The foundations most recent law passed includes the law SB 343. The SB 343 law forces all plastics in California to display the resin code in order to not confuse the consumer of confusing the plastic product as recyclable. This also hits on they want the producers to "GreenCycle" or "Wish-Cycle" which is unlawful due to misconception of the products nature.

== Membership ==
Membership in PLASTICS is divided into four different industry councils, each one representing a different segment of the plastics industry:

- Materials Suppliers
- Processors
- Brand Owners
- Equipment Manufacturers and Moldmakers

The organization also hosts international plastics showcase NPE, among largest triennial trade show for the global plastics industry.

== See also ==
- British Plastics Federation
