= Descriptive Color Names Dictionary =

The Descriptive Color Names Dictionary is a dictionary of color names used for mass-market clothing and consumer merchandise, such as those in mail order catalogs. It relates each color name to one or more color swatches in the Color Harmony Manual, a color atlas based on the Ostwald color system. The book was edited by Helen Taylor, Lucille Knoche, and Walter Granville, and was published by the Container Corporation of America in 1950 and distributed free to owners of the Color Harmony Manual.

The editors decided to use the Color Harmony Manual and the Ostwald system as a basis for their dictionary because it is easy to relate to basic color names, includes the color gamut of most mass-market products, and has easily removable double-sided (one glossy, one matte) color chips. Because colorimetric coordinates of the Color Harmony Dictionary were published, the names can also be easily related to other color order systems.

== Choice of names ==
The editors chose the names for the dictionary and their corresponding colors by comparing the chips in the Color Harmony Manual to physical products advertised with color names, and also made reference to a number of already published color dictionaries. Where names referred to natural objects they examined those objects directly.
