= Polyacrylonitrile =

Names
- IUPAC name poly(1-acrylonitrile)
- Other names Polyvinyl cyanide Creslan 61

Identifiers
CAS Number	25014-41-9
Abbreviations	PAN
CompTox Dashboard (EPA)	DTXSID301010964

Properties
Chemical formula	(C_{3}H_{3}N)_{n}
Molar mass	53.0626 ± 0.0028 g/mol C 67.91%, H 5.7%, N 26.4%
Appearance	White solid
Density	1.184 g/cm^{3}
Melting point	300 °C (572 °F; 573 K)
Boiling point	Degrades
Solubility in water	Insoluble
- Except where otherwise noted, data are given for materials in their standard state (at 25 °C [77 °F], 100 kPa). Infobox references

Polyacrylonitrile (PAN) is a synthetic, semicrystalline organic polymer resin, with the linear formula (CH_{2}CHCN)_{n}. Almost all PAN resins are copolymers with acrylonitrile as the main monomer. PAN is used to produce large variety of products including ultra filtration membranes, hollow fibers for reverse osmosis, fibers for textiles, and oxidized PAN fibers.

PAN fibers are the chemical precursor of very high-quality carbon fiber. PAN is first thermally oxidized in air at 230 °C to form an oxidized PAN fiber. It is then carbonized above 1000 °C in inert atmosphere to make carbon fibers. These fibers are found in a variety of both high-tech and common daily applications such as civil and military aircraft primary and secondary structures, missiles, solid propellant rocket motors, pressure vessels, fishing rods, tennis rackets and bicycle frames.

It is a component repeat unit in several important copolymers, such as styrene-acrylonitrile (SAN) and acrylonitrile butadiene styrene (ABS) plastic.

== Properties ==
Although it is thermoplastic, polyacrylonitrile does not melt under normal conditions. It degrades before melting. It melts above 300 °C if the heating rates are 50 °C per minute or above.

Glass transition temperature is around 95 °C and fusion temperature is at 322 °C. PAN is soluble in polar solvents, such as dimethylformamide, dimethylacetamide, ethylene and propylene carbonates, and in aqueous solutions of sodium thiocyanate, zinc chloride or nitric acid. Hildebrand solubility parameters are 26.09 MPa^{1/2} (25 °C) and 25.6 to 31.5 J^{1/2}·cm^{−3/2}. Dielectric constants are 5.5 (1 kHz, 25 °C) and 4.2 (1 MHz, 25 °C). It can behave as a branched or linear polymer.

In the production of carbon fibers containing 600 tex (6k) PAN tow, the linear density of filaments is 0.12 tex and the filament diameter is 11.6 μm, which produces a carbon fiber that has a filament strength of 417 kgf/mm^{2} and binder content of 38.6%.

== Synthesis ==
Most commercial methods for the synthesis of PAN are based on free radical polymerization of acrylonitrile. In most cases, 1–10% of other vinyl comonomers are also used along with AN depending on the final application. Comonomers include acrylic acid, acrylamide, allyl compounds, and sulfonated styrene. Anionic polymerization also can be used for synthesizing PAN. For textile applications, a molecular weight in the range of 40,000 to 70,000 is used. For producing carbon fiber, higher molecular weight is desired.

== Applications ==
Homopolymers of polyacrylonitrile have been used as fibers in hot gas filtration systems, outdoor awnings, sails for yachts, and fiber-reinforced concrete.

PAN absorbs many metal ions as a result is used in absorption materials. Polymers containing amidoxime groups can be used for the treatment of metals because of the polymers’ complex-forming capabilities with metal ions.

PAN has a low density, high thermal stability, and high strength and modulus of elasticity. These properties have made PAN an essential polymer in high-tech applications. Its high tensile strength and tensile modulus are established by fiber sizing, coatings, production processes, and PAN's fiber chemistry. Its mechanical properties are important in composite structures for military and commercial aircraft.

=== Spun fiber ===
Copolymers containing polyacrylonitrile are often used as fibers to make knitted clothing like socks and sweaters, as well as outdoor products such as tents. Acrylonitrile is commonly employed as a comonomer with styrene, e.g. acrylonitrile, styrene and acrylate plastics. Labelling of items of clothing with acrylic (see acrylic fiber) means the polymer consists of at least 85% acrylonitrile as the monomer. A typical comonomer is vinyl acetate, which can be solution-spun readily to obtain fibers that soften enough to allow penetration by dyes. The advantages of the use of these acrylics are that they are low-cost compared to natural fiber, they offer better sunlight resistance and have superior resistance to attack by moths. Acrylics modified with halogen-containing comonomers are classified as modacrylics, which by definition contain more than PAN percentages between 35-85%. Incorporation of halogen groups increases the flame resistance of the fiber, which makes modacrylics suitable for the use in sleepwear, tents and blankets. Some mattresses also use them to meet the flame resistance requirements in North America. However, the disadvantage of these products is that they are costly and can shrink after drying.

=== Carbon fiber ===
Polyacrylonitrile is used as the precursor for 90% of carbon fiber production. Approximately 20–25% of Boeing and Airbus wide-body airframes are carbon fibers. However, applications are limited by PAN's high price of around $15/lb.

Carbon fibers formed using resonant acoustic mixing with boron nitride nanotubes have an increased tensile strength and storage modulus.

=== Glassy carbon ===
Glassy carbon, a common electrode material in electrochemistry, is created by heat-treating blocks of polyacrylonitrile under pressure at 1000 to 3000 °C over a period of several days. The process removes non-carbon atoms and creates a conjugated double bond structure with excellent conductivity.

=== Support polymer ===
Divinylbenzene-crosslinked polyacrylonitrile is a precursor to ion exchange resins. Hydrolysis converts the nitrile groups to carboxylic acids. Amberlite IRC86 is one commercial product. These weakly acidic resins have high affinities for divalent metal ions like Ca^{2+} and Mg^{2+}.

== History ==
Polyacrylonitrile (PAN) was first synthesized in 1930 by Hans Fikentscher and Claus Heuck in the Ludwigshafen works of the German chemical conglomerate IG Farben. However, as PAN is non-fusible, and did not dissolve in any of the industrial solvents being used at the time, further research into the material was halted.

In 1931, Herbert Rein, head of polymer fiber chemistry at the Bitterfeld plant of IG Farben, obtained a sample of PAN while visiting the Ludwigshafen works. He found that pyridinium benzylchloride, an ionic liquid, would dissolve PAN. He spun the first fibers based on PAN in 1938, using aqueous solutions of quaternary ammonium sodium thiocyanate and aluminum perchlorate for the production process and considered other solvents including DMF. However, commercial introduction was delayed due to the wartime stresses on infrastructure, inability to melt the polymer without degradation, and solvents to allow solution processing were not known yet.

The first mass production run of PAN fiber was in 1946 by American chemical conglomerate DuPont. The German intellectual property had been stolen in Operation Paperclip. The product, branded as Orlon, was based on a patent filed exactly seven days after a nearly identical German claim.

In the German Democratic Republic (GDR), industrial polyacrylonitrile fibre production was started in 1956 at the VEB Film- und Chemiefaserwerk Agfa Wolfen due to the preliminary work of the "Wolcrylon" collective (de:Max Duch, Herbert Lehnert et al.). Prior to this, the preconditions for the production of the raw materials had been created at the Buna Werke Schkopau (Polyacrylonitrile) and Leuna works (Dimethylformamide). In the same year, the collective was awarded the GDR's National Prize II Class for Science and Technology for its achievements.
