= Kaneka Corporation =

Japanese chemical manufacturing company

- Native name: 株式会社カネカ
- Type: Public KK
- Traded as: TYO: 4118; NAG: 4118
- ISIN: JP3215800008
- Industry: Chemistry
- Founded: (September 1, 1949; 76 years ago)
- Headquarters: Nakanoshima, Kita-ku, Osaka, 530-8288 (Osaka head office); Akasaka, Minato-ku, Tokyo, 107-6025 (Tokyo head office), Japan
- Area served: Worldwide
- Key people: Kimikazu Sugawara (Chairman); Mamoru Kadokura (President)
- Products: Chemicals; Functional plastics; Expandable plastics; Foodstuffs; Life science products; Electronic products; Synthetic fibers
- Revenue: ▲JPY 552.1 billion (FY 2014) (US$ 5 billion) (FY 2014)
- Net income: ▲JPY 18 billion (FY 2014) (US$ 164.1 million) (FY 2014)
- Number of employees: 8,529 (as of March 31, 2015)
- Subsidiaries: Kaneka Americas; Kaneka Belgium; Kaneka Europe; Kaneka Eurogentec; Kaneka Nutrients; Kaneka Malaysia; Kaneka Singapore; Kaneka Indonesia; Kaneka Thailand; Kaneka Korea; Kaneka Sanghai (KTSC); Kaneka North America
- Website: Official website

Kaneka Corporation (株式会社カネカ, Kabushiki-gaisha Kaneka) is a Japanese international chemical manufacturing company based in Osaka. The company was founded in 1949 and produces chemical products such as functional resin, foam resin, and synthetic fibers.

The company was also engaged in the medical equipment business. In recent years, the company manufactured raw material for production of coenzyme Q10, and apheresis devices, where blood of a donor or patient is passed through an apparatus that separates out one particular constituent and returns the remainder to the circulation.

== History ==
In 1949, the company was founded by separating from the Kanegafuchi Spinning Company, Ltd. with capital of 200 million yen. The company started with developing and producing vinyl chloride named "Kanevinyl". In 1950, the Osaka "Kanevinyl" plant was completed and the mass production of PVC wire covering started in Sakamoto factory. Year later, the company developed vinyl chloride resin type "Kanebirakku" and started production in Osaka factory. In 1953, in addition to the margarine production in Takasagokogyosho, the company started production of a soft vinyl chloride compound "Kanevinyl". In 1957, the company started the production of acrylic synthetic fiber named "Kanekalon".

In 1961, the company developed and marketed "Belco" for Fats and Oils, Ltd. and started the production in Takasago, Hyōgo. In 1965, the company developed expandable styrene-acrylonitrile resin named "Kanepearl". In 1966, Osaka factory developed the acrylonitrile butadiene styrene (ABS RESIN). In 1967, the company developed vinyl chloride resin paste named "Kanevinyl paste", which began producing in Osaka factory. In 1968, the company established offices in Europe and New York. Production of extruded polystyrene foam board named "Kanelite Foam" began in Kaneka Belgium.

In 1971, Kaneka Americas founded "Kanepearl" plant. In 1972, the company developed polystyrene paper, while development and commercialization of production for flame-retardant ABS resin "Enpurekkusu" started in Osaka factory. In 1979, Kaneka Singapore was founded. The production of modified silicone polymer named "Kaneka MS polymer" started in Kanepearl, now Kaneka Ken.

In 1980, the company marketed reaction intermediate HPG. In 1983, the company developed and marketed AMMPA Kaneka, intermediate for antihypertensive drug, as well as acrylic silicone polymer, Kaneka Gemlac. In 1985, the company developed and marketed polypropylene foam by using bead method. In 1986, the company developed and marketed plasmapheresis system. In 1989, the company developed modified PET resin named "Kaneka Hyperite".

In 1991, the company developed and marketed "Selesorb", a selective adsorption column for systemic lupus erythematosus. In 1993, the company established Nantong Sunrise Worsted Spinning Co., Ltd. as a joint venture with Kyusyu Kanekalon Co., Ltd. Kanematsu Corporation, and Toyobo Co., Ltd. In 1997, the company established Kaneka High-Tech Materials, Inc. to succeed the apical operations of Allied-Apical Company, Inc.

In 2000, the company acquired ISO 14001 certificate for its four plants located in Japan. In the same year, new Eperan factory in Michigan for Kaneka Texas Corporation was completed. The company also received ISO 9001 certificate for all related company divisions involved in making Kanelite Foam. In the same year, the company developed word's first non-fluorocarbon, non-halogen foaming agent type Kanelite Foam, the Type 3 insulation panel. In 2003, the company developed an imide film capable of forming a three-dimensional optical waveguide with a laser. In 2005, the company developed an industry's first acryl grafted vinyl chloride copolymer named "PRICTMER". One year later, in 2006, the company industrialized the world's first telechelic polyacrylate. In the same year, they developed a new injection molding resin by applying proprietary nanocomposite technology and developed toughness-enhancing master batches for epoxy resin. In 2008, the company developed a new resin with high mechanical strength and high light resistance named "ILLUMIKA", and developed the world's most advanced high thermal conductive graphite sheet, named Graphinity.

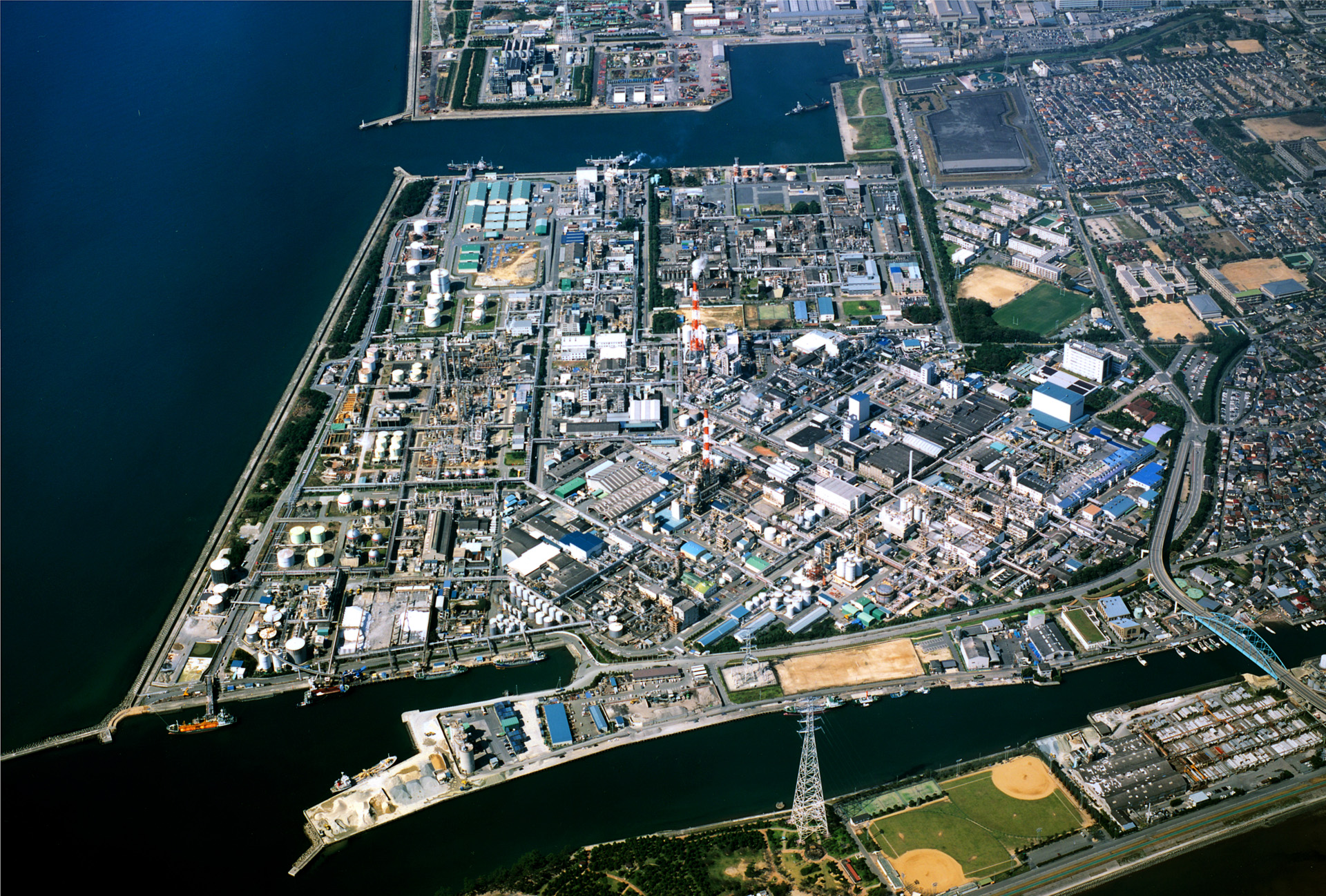
Aerial view of Kanaka's Takasago plant

In 2010, the company developed new thermally conductive plastics with electric insulating properties, and the first dual UV/moisture-curing adhesive, together with ChemTech. In the same year, the company formed a capital alliance with the Belgian biotechnology company Eurogentec. In 2011, the company developed the first completely bio-based polymer with soft and heat-resistant properties, as well as a new thermosetting imide resin for a carbon-fiber-reinforced composite material with high heat resistance. In 2012, the company established Kaneka Asia Co., Ltd., an Asia regional umbrella hub based in Shanghai, China, as well as the Kaneka Americas Holding, Inc., an America regional umbrella hub based in Texas, United States. In 2013, the company established Kaneka South America Representative Ltd. and Kaneka Foods Indonesia. In the same year the company founded Kaneka US Material Research Center Facility, in partnership with Texas A&M University.

== Products ==
=== Bio-pharmaceutical research and development support ===
On March 6, 2015, the United States Food and Drug Administration authorized use of Lixelle Beta 2-microglobulin Apheresis Column, the first device to treat Haemodialysis-associated amyloidosis (DRA) developed and produced by Kaneka Corporation. The Lixelle Column system is used for helping patient to eliminate agents that cause inflammation. The system is used in treatment of HIV, arthritis, cholesterol management and ulcerative colitis.

== See also ==
- Modacrylic
