= Acrylonitrile styrene acrylate =

Chemical compound

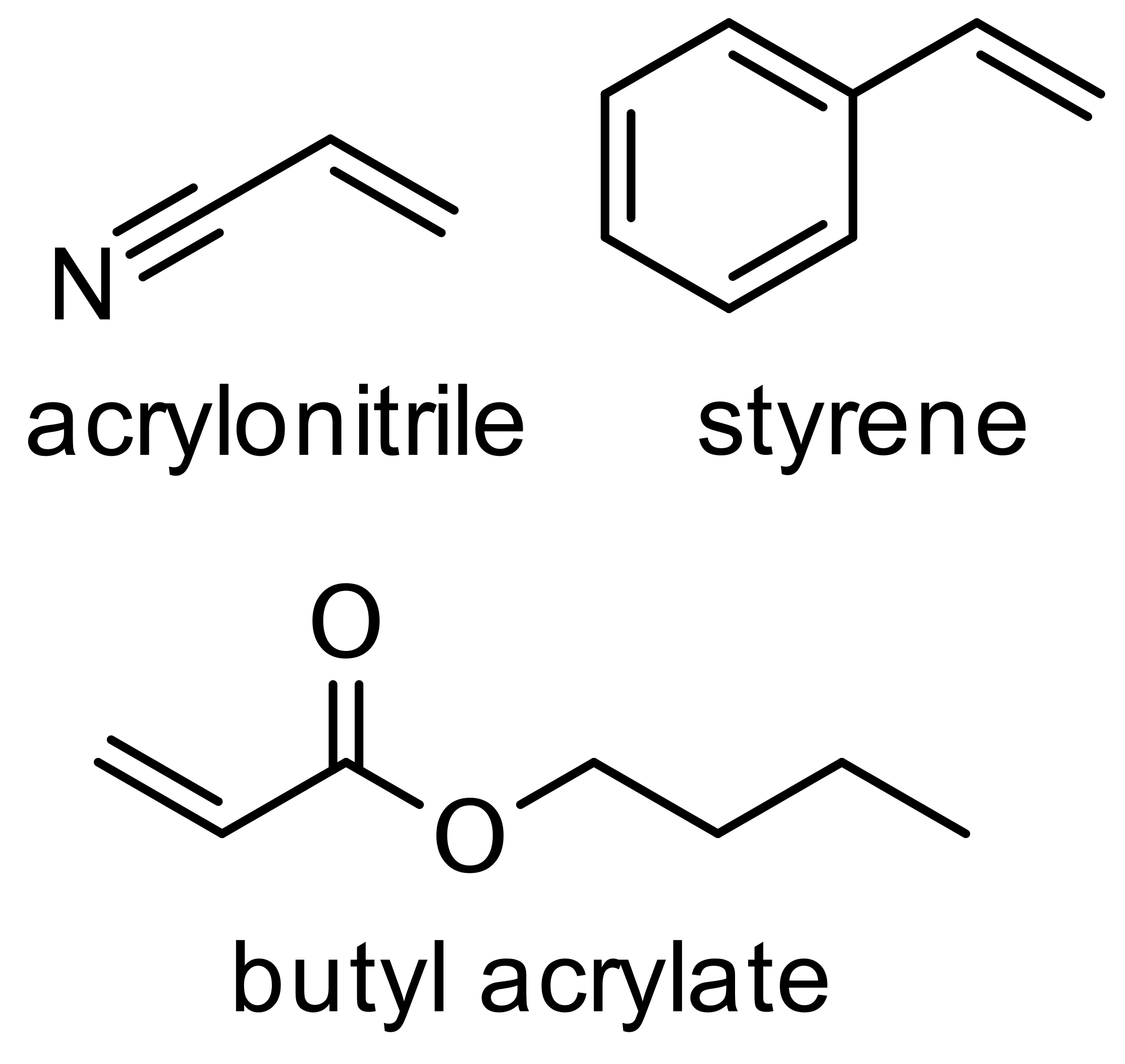
- Monomers in ASA polymer

Identifiers
PubChem CID	168508

Properties
Chemical formula	C_{18}H_{23}NO_{2}

Related compounds
Related compounds	acrylonitrile; styrene; butyl acrylate
- Except where otherwise noted, data are given for materials in their standard state (at 25 °C [77 °F], 100 kPa). Infobox references

Acrylonitrile styrene acrylate (ASA), also called acrylic styrene acrylonitrile, is an amorphous thermoplastic developed as an alternative to acrylonitrile butadiene styrene (ABS), that has improved weather resistance. It is an acrylate rubber-modified styrene acrylonitrile copolymer. It is used for general prototyping in 3D printing, where its UV resistance and mechanical properties make it an excellent material for use in fused filament fabrication printers, particularly for outdoor applications. ASA is also widely used in the automotive industry.

== Properties ==
ASA is structurally very similar to ABS. The spherical particles of slightly crosslinked acrylate rubber (instead of butadiene rubber), functioning as an impact modifier, are chemically grafted with styrene-acrylonitrile copolymer chains, and embedded in styrene-acrylonitrile matrix. The acrylate rubber differs from the butadiene based rubber by absence of double bonds, which gives the material about ten times the weathering resistance and resistance to ultraviolet radiation of ABS, higher long-term heat resistance, and better chemical resistance. ASA is significantly more resistant to environmental stress cracking than ABS, especially to alcohols and many cleaning agents. n-Butyl acrylate rubber is usually used, but other esters can be encountered too, e.g. ethyl hexyl acrylate. ASA has lower glass transition temperature than ABS, 100 °C vs 105 °C, providing better low-temperature properties to the material.

ASA has high outdoor weatherability; it retains gloss, color, and mechanical properties in outdoor exposure. It has good chemical and heat resistance, high gloss, good antistatic properties, and is tough and rigid. It is used in applications requiring weatherability, e.g. commercial siding, outside parts of vehicles, or outdoor furniture.

ASA is compatible with some other plastics, namely polyvinyl chloride and polycarbonate. ASA-PVC compounds are in use.

ASA can be processed by extrusion and coextrusion, thermoforming, injection molding, extrusion blow molding, and structural foam molding.

ASA is mildly hygroscopic; drying may be necessary before processing.

ASA exhibits low moulding shrinkage.

ASA can be used as an additive to other polymers, when their heat distortion (resulting in deformed parts made of the material) has to be lowered.

ASA can be coextruded with other polymers, so only the ASA layer is exposed to high temperature or weathering. ASA foils are used in in-mold decoration for forming e.g. car exterior panels.

ASA can be welded to itself or to some other plastics. Ultrasonic welding can be used to join ASA to PVC, ABS, SAN, PMMA, and some others.

ASA can be solvent-welded, using e.g. cyclohexane, 1,2-dichloroethane, methylene chloride, or 2-butanone. Such solvents can also join ASA with ABS and SAN. Solutions of ASA in these solvents can also be used as adhesives.

ASA can be glued with cyanoacrylates; uncured resin can however cause stress cracking. ASA is compatible with acrylic-based adhesives. Anaerobic adhesives perform poorly with ASA. Epoxies and neoprene adhesives can be used for bonding ASA with woods and metals.

ASA waste can be combined with sand for pavement structures. The dynamic modulus results showed that the ASA mixtures have improved high-temperature deformation resistance as compared to the asphalt mixtures. The ASA mixtures have excellent rutting resistance and moisture damage resistance. The tensile strength ratio of the ASA and asphalt mixture are all larger than 0.8 and therefore satisfy the Superpave specification. The average coefficient of permeability of the ASA mixture is 6–10 times higher than the asphalt mixture in the same air void level. The average aggregate loss percent of the ASA mixtures is 9.2–10.8 times higher than asphalt mixtures. Overall, sand and ASA plastic mixtures were found to be an adequate substitute for asphalt mixtures typically used for road surfaces. ASA and sand can also be used in 3D printing and injection molding as a low-cost method of distributed recycling.

Compared to polycarbonate, ASA has higher resistance to environmental stress cracking, and exhibits lower yellowing in outdoor applications. Compared to polypropylene, ASA has lower moulding shrinkage (0.5% vs 1.5%), higher stiffness, impact resistance, heat distortion temperature, and weatherability.

== History ==
In the 1960s, James A. Herbig and Ival O. Salyer of Monsanto were the first to attempt to make what would become ASA using butyl acrylate as the rubber phase. This work was then refined by Hans-Werner Otto and Hans Peter Siebel of BASF using a copolymer of butyl acrylate with butadiene for the rubber phase.

== Production ==
ASA can be made by either a reaction process of all three monomers (styrene, acrylonitrile, acrylic ester) or a graft process, although the graft process is the typical method. A grafted acrylic ester elastomer is introduced during the copolymerization of styrene and acrylonitrile. The elastomer is introduced as a powder.

As of 2003, there were only few large manufacturers of ASA; e.g. BASF, General Electric, Bayer, Miele, Hitachi, and LG Chem. The production process is similar to ABS, but it has some key differences and difficulties. The annual demand around 2003 was about 1-5% of ABS.

== Applications ==
ASA/PC (polycarbonate) blends have been prepared and are commercially available.

In the Fused Filament Fabrication 3-D printing process, the ASA filament is used to fabricate 3-D printed parts, which above all must absorb a certain amount of impact and impact energy without breaking. Substantial effort has been focused on 3D printing parameter optimization by many methods including with the Taguchi methods to enable ASA to be used for high-end applications.

ASA with compounds of silver, rendering its surface antimicrobial by the silver's oligodynamic effect, was introduced to the market in 2008.

3D printed ASA can be used for absorbers for water desalination.
