= Jay Polychem =

Indian petrochemical distribution company

Jay Polychem India Ltd
- Industry: Petrochemicals
- Founded: 1991
- Headquarters: Delhi, India
- Parent: Jay Polychem Group
- Website: http://www.jaypolychem.com

Jay Polychem India Ltd is a petrochemical distribution company based in Delhi, India. Founded in 1991, the company's core expertise lies in sourcing, storage and distribution of petrochemicals.

== Products ==
Jay Polychem deals in a range of products including polymers and petrochemicals. Its products include:

=== Petrochemicals ===
- Benzene
- Toluene
- Caustic soda
- Soda ash
- Polyolefin
- Ortho-xylene
- Para-xylene
- Mixed xylene

=== Polymers ===
- PC
- POM
- PBT
- ASA

== Controversies ==
=== Whistleblower harassment and torture allegations ===
Samdeep Mohan Vargheese, a former Vice President of Jay Polychem, had complained of instances of money laundering and other irregularities. The company made a complaint to Punjab Police, even though it had its head office in Delhi. The police proceeded to arrest Samdeep, but he was granted anticipatory bail by Kerala High Court. The Punjab Police then detained a former house-help of Samdeep from Mumbai, took him to Punjab and tortured him at the police station. It has been reported that the interrogation and torture was overseen by Sandeep Madhok, an owner of the company.

Samdeep subsequently alleged that in May 2012, he was threatened by a group of 8 people, allegedly the henchmen of Jay Polychem, to leave Delhi immediately and not make any allegations against the Company. He alleged that two days later, two men armed with knives and country-made guns tried to stop him and threatened him to not "mess around with Madhok group". A Delhi Court ordered the registration of an FIR on his allegations.

The complaint against Samdeep was filed on behalf of the Jay Polychem by Amardeep Singh, another employee of the company. He subsequently stated that he was simply asked to sign some papers, which he did without verification, and only later learned that he was made to sign a complaint against Samdeep. He resigned from the company, but was later called to the office where he was beaten with leather belts. Subsequently, he was picked up by Punjab Police and tortured at Rajpura Police Station. This torture was also being overseen by Sandeep Madhok. Amardeep Singh was subsequently named as an accused, though he was originally the complainant.

=== Bank fraud ===
The Central Bureau of Investigation (CBI) has booked Jay Polychem for a bank fraud of Rs. 1800 crores. The CBI issued look-out circulars against the owners of the company. An audit by Ernst & Young revealed fictitious transactions, syphoning of funds and forgery.
