= Kaneka =

Kaneka may refer to:

- Kaneka, a musical genre developed by the Kanak people of New Caledonia
- Kaneka Corporation, a Japanese chemical company
