= Eurogentec =

Biotech company

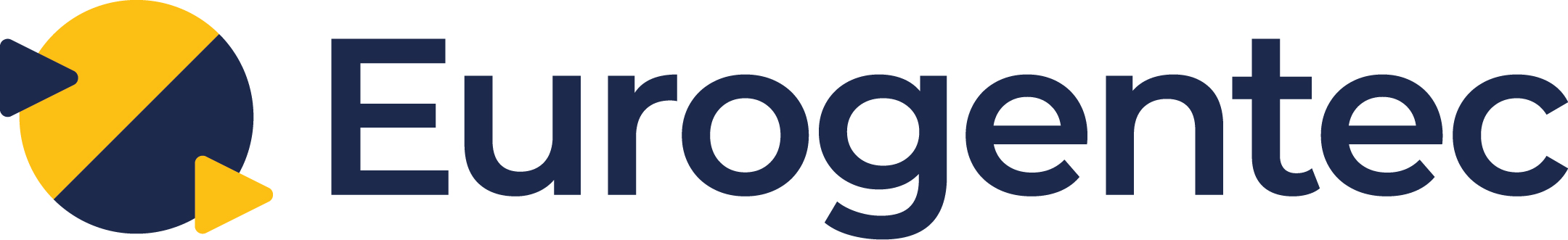
- Company type: Private company
- Industry: Biotechnology
- Founded: 1985
- Headquarters: Seraing, Liège, Belgium
- Key people: Lieven Janssens, CEO
- Products: Proteins, plasmids, vaccines, Oligonucleotides, qPCR Reagents, Antibodies, Peptides and Fluorophores Dyes & Quenchers
- Number of employees: > 400 (2022)
- Website: www.eurogentec.com

Eurogentec is a biotechnology supplier, based in Belgium, that specializes in genomics and proteomics kits, reagents, and certain biologics. It was founded in 1985 as a spin-off from the University of Liège. Eurogentec operates two licensed contract manufacturing organization facilities in Belgium which produce custom biologic and oligonucleotide products mainly for European pharmaceutical companies, but also holds a license from the U.S. FDA to export a commercial protein product to the U.S.. These products are used to diagnose and treat various conditions.

== History ==
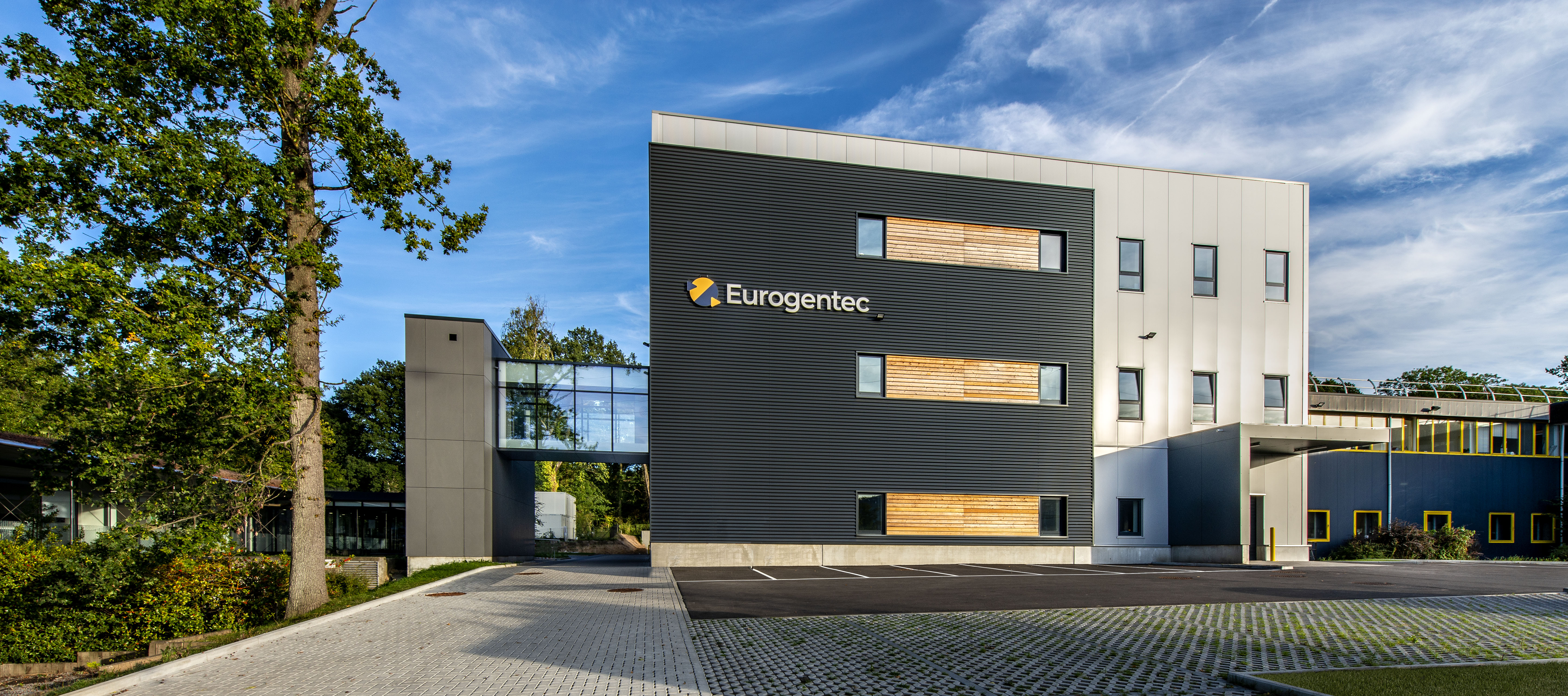
Eurogentec Biologics building in Seraing, Belgium

University of Liège professors Joseph Martial and André Renard established Eurogentec in 1985.

Prior to establishing Eurogentec, Martial studied genetic engineering at University of California, San Francisco. Martial then returned to Europe and helped commercialize certain genetic engineering research products of the University of Liège.

The company began working out of the university's laboratories and focused on developing a genetically-engineered vaccine to enhance fish breeding.

Initially, the company focused on the development of a genetic engineering-based vaccine tailored for enhancing fish breeding.

In 1987, Eurogentec started to distribute Oligonucleotides for Research laboratories. The company's first years were difficult but in the very early 1990s, Jean-Pierre Delwart, economist from Brussels University, boarded the ship and put Eurogentec in a favorable current.

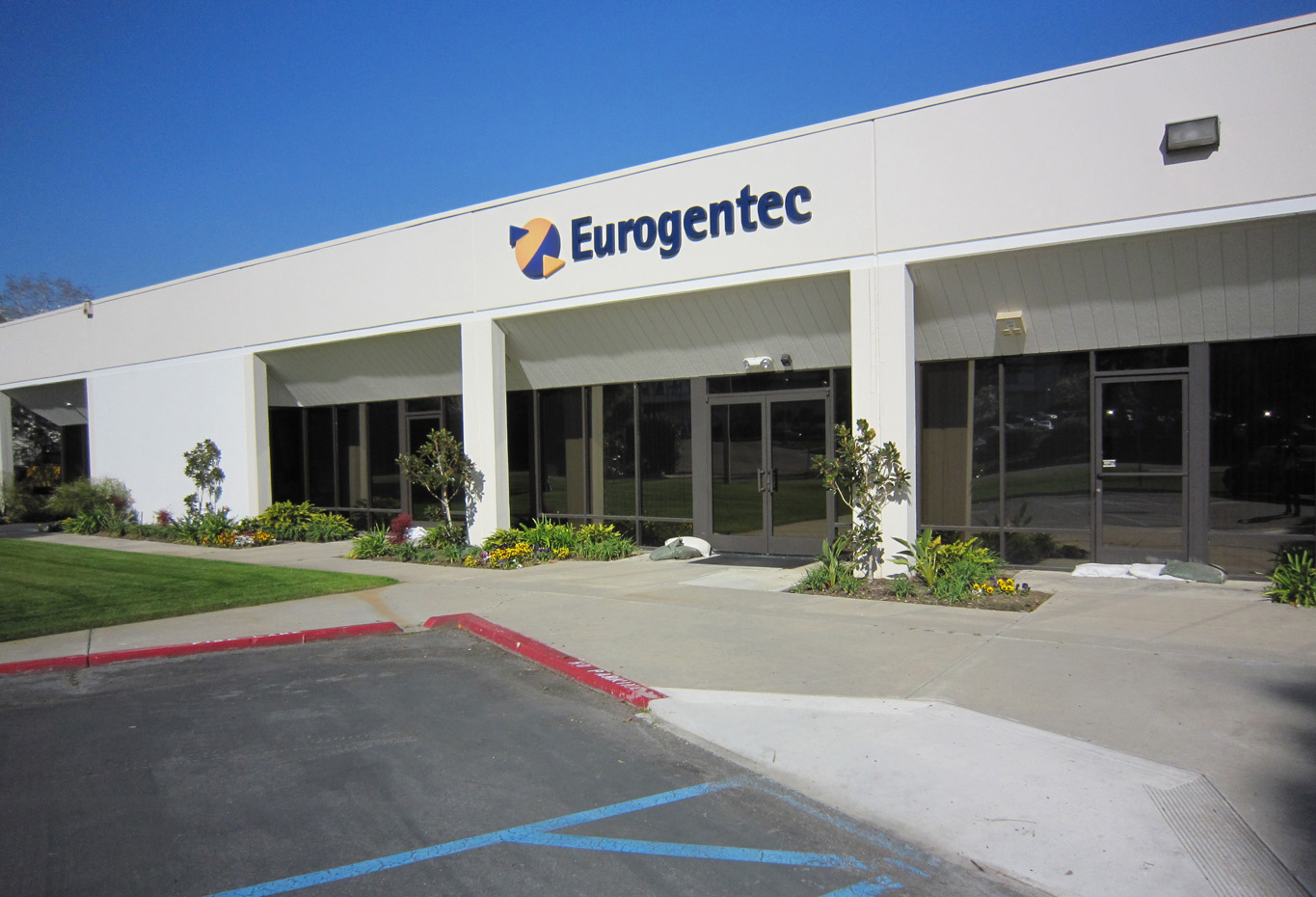
EGT North America, San Diego, CA

In 1996, it became a contract research organization (CRO) for the biopharmaceutical sector and entered into collaboration with SmithKline Beecham biologicals (Rixensart, Belgium) for the production of recombinant proteins for phase I, II and III clinical trials. In addition to its pharmaceutical manufacturing activities, Eurogentec became a service company for the biotechnical research industry and university laboratories.

In 1999, Eurogentec acquired Oswel Research Product Ltd. a biotechnology company based in Southampton, Great Britain and specialized in the synthesis of chemically modified and complex oligonucleotides and their analogues (DNA, RNA, PNA).

In 2002, Eurogentec acquired Wita Proteomics, a company specialized in proteomics services, based in Berlin (Germany). A few months later, Eurogentec installed its US office in San Diego for the production of oligonucleotides (EGT NA).

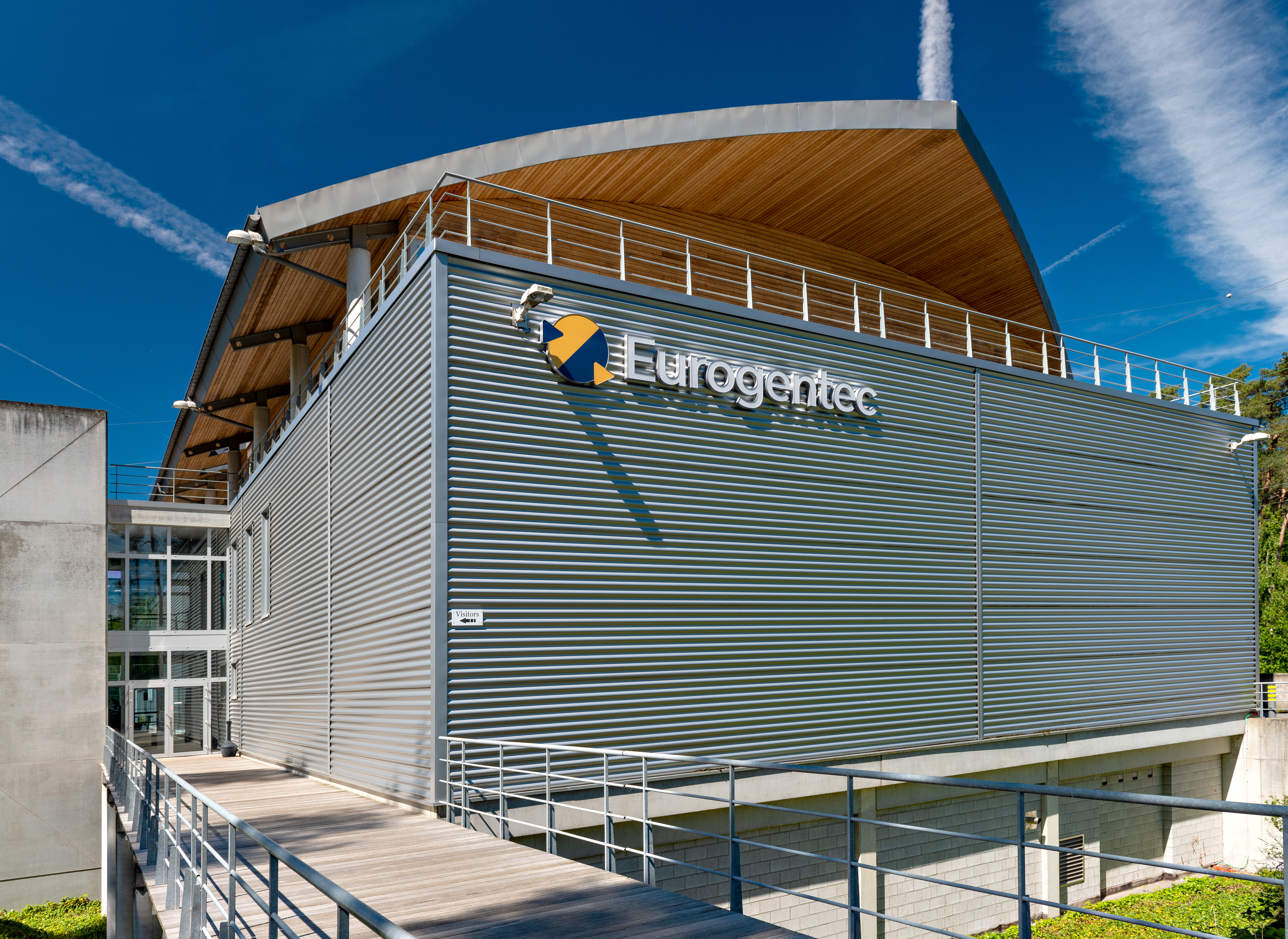
Eurogentec headquarters building in Seraing, Belgium

In 2004, Eurogentec opened its new production laboratories (Oligonucleotides and peptides synthesis) in the Liege Science PARK (Belgium). This intelligent building is also ecological: the building is equipped with a home automation system (lighting without switch) and the heating is produced from a condensation boiler allowing energy savings.

From 2000 to 2008 Eurogentec intensified its services and signed agreements with several companies like Cepheid, Epoch Biosciences, Exiqon, Delphi, In Cell Art.

2007: In order to fully meet the Oligonucleotide in vitro diagnostics stringent manufacturing requirements, Eurogentec expanded its current GMP facility in Liège.

In 2008, Eurogentec received ISO 13485 Certification for the production and sales of In Vitro Diagnostics (IVD) oligonucleotides in Liège. Two years after EGT NA also received ISO 13485 certification for the Oligonucleotide diagnostics manufacturing.

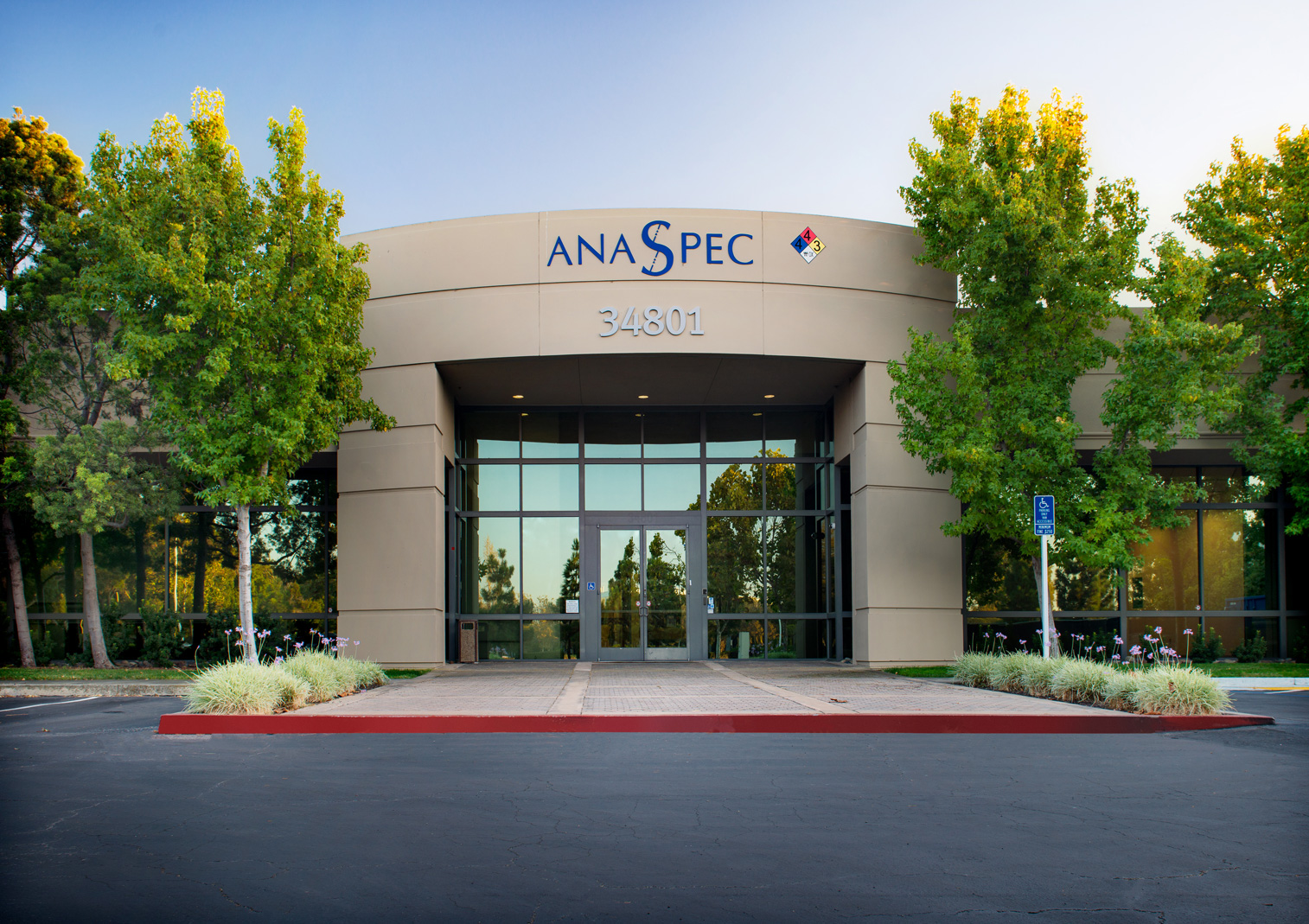
AnaSpec's facility, Fremont, CA

In 2009 of October, Eurogentec announced the acquisition of AnaSpec, a privately owned proteomics company based in Fremont, USA. Anaspec is a provider of proteomics for life science research; they specialize in peptides synthesis, labelled peptides and antibodies, fluorescent dyes and enzyme activity assays.

In 2010, Kaneka acquired a majority stake in Eurogentec S.A. Kaneka's products include synthetic resins, resin products, chemicals, foodstuffs, pharmaceuticals, medical devices, electrical raw materials and synthetic fibres.

In 2012, the company started commercial manufacturing of a biopharmaceutical for USA market.

== Products and services ==
Eurogentec has developed three interrelated business units, Life Science Research Products and Services, In Vitro Diagnostics Manufacturing Solutions, and GMP Biomanufacturing.

The life science business unit specializes in genomics, and involves the development of oligonucleotides, DNA polymerases, Real-time qPCR Probes, assay services, and proteomics. The proteomics operations are primarily concerned with custom peptides and antibodies, assay kits and Proprietary Dyes & Quenchers.

The in vitro diagnostics business unit provides technical and project support for contract manufacturing of good manufacturing practice (GMP) Oligonucleotides and Taq DNA polymerases for use in Molecular Diagnostic applications. Manufacturing processes take place in clean rooms.

The GMP BioManufacturing BU, is a full-service Contract Manufacturing Organization (CMO) and offers significant know-how in process development, technology transfer, formulation, scale-up and manufacturing of GMP proteins, protein conjugates, plasmids and bacterial vaccines for pre-clinical, clinical and commercial uses, all according to U.S. Food and Drug Administration (FDA) and EMA requirements.

== Products in development ==
As of September 2014, Eurogentec Biologics was developing a vaccine against bilharziosis called Bilhvax in partnership with INSERM and researchers from the Pasteur Institute; the vaccine candidate was starting Phase III trials at that time.
