= Acrylic fiber =

Synthetic fiber made from polymer

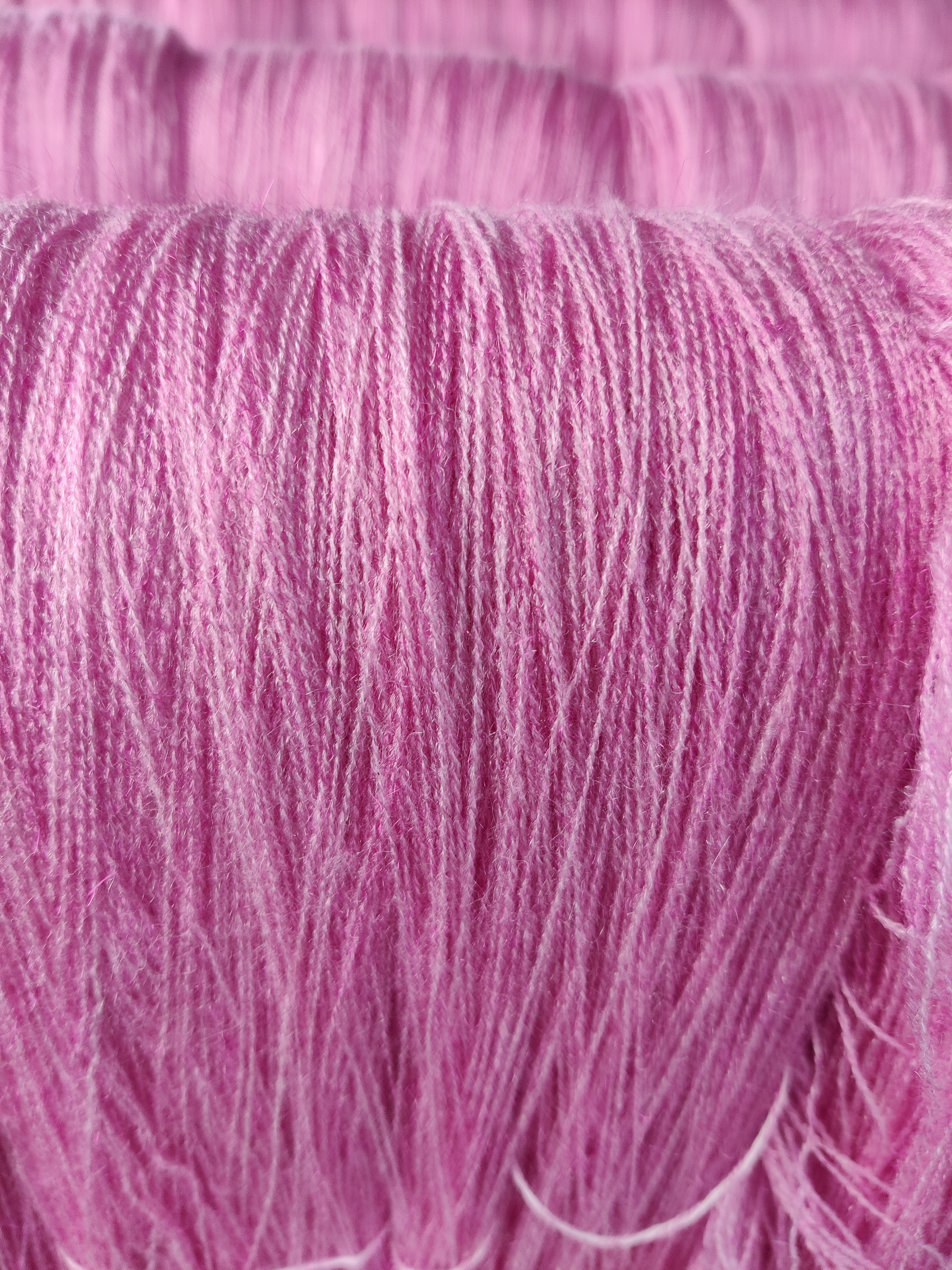
Acrylic yarn dyed with basic dyes

Acrylic fibers are synthetic fibers made from a polymer (polyacrylonitrile) with an average molecular weight of ~100,000, about 1900 monomer units. For a fiber to be called "acrylic" in the US, the polymer must contain at least 85% acrylonitrile monomer. Typical comonomers are vinyl acetate or methyl acrylate. DuPont created the first acrylic fibers in 1941 and trademarked them under the name Orlon. It was first developed in the mid-1940s but was not produced in large quantities until the 1950s. Strong and warm, acrylic fiber is often used for sweaters and tracksuits and as linings for boots and gloves, as well as in furnishing fabrics and carpets. It is manufactured as a filament, then cut into short staple lengths similar to wool hairs, and spun into yarn.

Modacrylic is a modified acrylic fiber that contains at least 35% and at most 85% acrylonitrile. Vinylidene chloride or vinyl bromide used in modacrylic give the fiber flame retardant properties. End-uses of modacrylic include faux fur, wigs, hair extensions, and protective clothing.

== Production ==
The polymer is formed by free-radical polymerization in aqueous suspension. The fiber is produced by dissolving the polymer in a solvent such as N,N-dimethylformamide (DMF) or aqueous sodium thiocyanate, metering it through a multi-hole spinneret and coagulating the resultant filaments in an aqueous solution of the same solvent (wet spinning) or evaporating the solvent in a stream of heated inert gas (dry spinning). Washing, stretching, drying, and crimping complete the processing. Acrylic fibers are produced in a range of deniers, usually from 0.9 to 15, as cut staple or as a 500,000 to 1 million filaments tow. End uses include sweaters, hats, hand-knitting yarns, socks, rugs, awnings, boat covers, and upholstery; the fiber is also used as "PAN" precursor for carbon fiber. Production of acrylic fibers is centered in the Far East, Turkey, India, Mexico, and South America, though a number of European producers still continue to operate, including Dralon and Fisipe. US producers have ended production (except for specialty uses such as in friction materials, gaskets, specialty papers, conductive, and stucco), though acrylic tow and staple are still spun into yarns in the USA. Former U.S. brands of acrylic included Acrilan (Monsanto), and Creslan (American Cyanamid). Other brand names that are still in use include Dralon (Dralon GmbH) and Drytex (Sudamericana de Fibras, S.A.). In the late 1950s, Courtaulds Ltd began investigating the production of an acrylic fiber later to be called "Courtelle" by a process of solvent polymerization. Methyl acrylate (6%) and acrylonitrile were polymerized in a 50% solution of sodium thiocyanate to produce a dope ready for spinning into a water bath to produce "courtelle" fiber in various grades of denier. The sodium thiocyanate solution was reconcentrated and re-used. The reaction was a continuous process, with about 5% of reactants being recycled. This recycling process resulted in the build-up of pollutants in the process, as did the recycling of the solvent. A great deal of research in the chemical engineering laboratory in Lockhurst Lane, Coventry, and on the pre-production pilot plant at Little Heath overcame the recycling problems. It resulted in the process becoming a commercial success at a new production plant in Grimsby.

== Textile uses ==
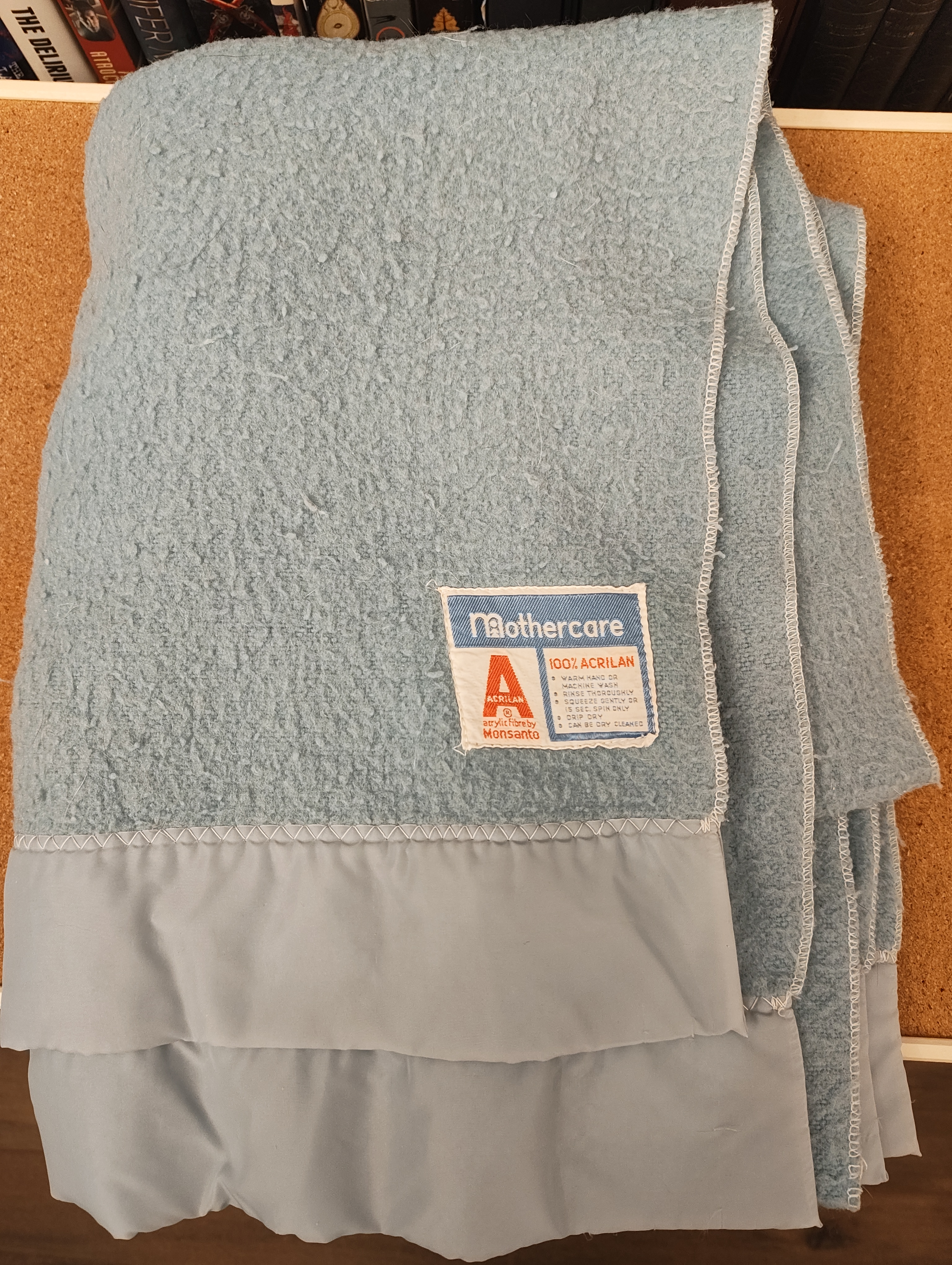
Mothercare baby blanket made with Acrilan, probably from the 1970s

Acrylic is lightweight, soft, and warm, with a wool-like feel. It can also be made to mimic other fibers, such as cotton, when spun on short staple equipment. Some acrylic is extruded in colored or pigmented form; others are extruded in "ecru", otherwise known as "natural," "raw white," or "undyed." Pigmented fiber has the highest color permanence. Its fibers are very resilient compared to both other synthetics and natural fibers. Some acrylic is used in clothing as a less expensive alternative to cashmere, due to the similar feeling of the materials. Some acrylic fabrics may fuzz or pill easily, though there are low-pilling variants. Acrylic takes color well, is washable, and is generally hypoallergenic. End-uses include socks, hats, gloves, scarves, sweaters, home furnishing fabrics, and awnings. Acrylic can also be used to make fake fur and to make many different knitted clothes.

As acrylic is a synthetic fiber, the larvae of clothes moths are unable to digest it. However, acrylic fibers that are blended with wool or soiled may be eaten as a consequence of having blended fibers.

Acrylic is the "workhorse" hand-crafting fiber for crafters who knit or crochet; acrylic yarn may be perceived as "cheap" because it is typically priced lower than its natural-fiber counterparts, and because it lacks some of their properties, including softness and propensity to felt. The fiber requires heat to "relax" or set the shape of the finished garment, and it is not as warm when wet as alternatives like wool. Some hand-knitters also complain that the fiber "squeaks" when knitted, or that it is painful to knit with because of a lack of "give" or stretch in the yarn. On the other hand, it is machine-washable and extremely color-fast. This makes it useful in certain items, like garments for babies, which require constant washing. However it is much more flammable than its natural fiber counterparts, so caution should be used when making items for babies and children.

== Microplastic release ==
A team at Plymouth University in the UK spent 12 months analyzing what happened when a number of synthetic materials were washed at different temperatures in domestic washing machines, using different combinations of detergents, to quantify the microfibers shed. They found that acrylic was responsible for releasing nearly 730,000 tiny synthetic particles (microplastics) per wash, five times more than polyester-cotton blend fabric, and nearly 1.5 times as many as pure polyester. Research by ecologist Mark Browne showed synthetic fiber waste over coastlines at a global scale, with the greatest concentration near sewage outflows. Of the man-made material found on the shoreline, 85% were microfibers and matched the types of material (such as nylon and acrylic) used in clothing.

== History ==
In the middle of the 20th century, the DuPont Company (USA) was actively developing a new material that could compete with the then-popular nylon in quality and properties. DuPont first introduced this material in 1948 to create a fabric that would be competitive with nylon in its properties. This research resulted in the emergence of Orlon, a synthetic fiber isolated from polymers. The material turned out to be incredibly practical and, by many characteristics, exceeded many artificial and natural analogs at that time. However, the new fabric had a significant disadvantage: the fibers could not be dyed. Only in 1952, four years later, DuPont chemists solved this problem. They created a new version of the previously invented synthetic fabric, which met all the requirements. And most importantly, it was perfectly dyed. A distinctive feature of the acrylic fiber is its burning behavior; it melts and emits acrid smoke with a sour smell. Although acrylic fabric has pros and cons, it is popular in the fashion and textile world due to its characteristics.

== See also ==
- List of fabrics
