= Modacrylic =

Synthetic copolymer

A modacrylic is a synthetic copolymer. Modacrylics are soft, strong, resilient and dimensionally stable. They can be easily dyed, show good press and shape retention, and are quick to dry. They have outstanding resistance to chemicals and solvents, are not attacked by moths or mildew, and are nonallergenic. Among their uses are in apparel linings, furlike outerwear, paint-roller covers, scatter rugs, carpets, and work clothing and as hair in wigs.

Commercial production of modacrylic fiber began in 1949 by Union Carbide Corporation in the United States. Modacrylic and acrylic fibers are similar in composition and at one time were in the same category. In 1960 the Federal Trade Commission decided to separate the two fibers and establish a category for each.

The Federal Trade Commission defines modacrylic fibers as manufactured fibers in which the fiber-forming substance is any long-chain synthetic polymer composed of less than 85%, but at least 35% weight acrylonitrile units except when the polymer qualifies as rubber.

== Production ==
Modacrylic fibers are modified acrylic fibers made from acrylonitriles, but larger amounts of other polymers are added to make the copolymers.

The modacrylic fibers are produced by polymerizing the components, dissolving the copolymer in acetone, pumping the solution into the column of warm air (dry-spun), and stretching while hot.

Modacrylics are creamy or white and are produced in tow and staple form. If looked at in cross section views they have an irregular shape. Modacrylic fibers are also produced in many different lengths, crimp levels, deniers and they can have various shrinkage potentials.

Current modacrylic fiber producers include Kaneka Corporation in Japan.

== Properties ==
A modacrylic has properties that are similar to an acrylic. However, modacrylics are flame retardant and do not combust. The fibers are difficult to ignite and will self-extinguish. In addition to a modacrylic's flame retardant properties it has a relatively high durability that is comparable to wool. Modacrylic fibers have a moderate resistance to abrasion and a very low tenacity.

One of the most interesting properties of Modacrylic fabrics is the arc flash protection, where it has very good values.

Modacrylics are poor conductors of heat. The fabrics are soft, warm and resilient but are prone to pilling and matting. Modacrylics display high performance when it comes to appearance retention. The fibers are quite resilient and will not wrinkle. They also have great dimensional stability and high elastic recovery, which gives them the ability to hold their shape.

== Care ==
Modacrylics are sensitive to loss of appearance due to improper care; therefore, it is important to know how to care for modacrylics. Modacrylics are resistant to acids, weak alkalis, and organic solvents. These fibers are also resistant to moths, mildew and sunlight. Modacrylic fabrics can be machine washed using warm water and tumble dried on a low setting. Modacrylic pieces can also be dry-cleaned, however, they should not be steamed and should only be tumbled on cold. Some fabrics may also be cleaned using the furrier method (a special non immersion cleaning process). The fibers are heat sensitive and will shrink at 121 °C (250 °F) and will stiffen at temperatures over 149 °C (300 °F).

== Uses ==
Modacrylics are used by producers of technically advanced fabrics for comfortable and protective blends often used in personal protective equipment, primarily when environmental resistance or flame retardancy is necessary or required. Modacrylics can combine flame retardancy with a relatively low density, keeping protective gear from being uncomfortably heavy (i.e. shirts and trousers worn by electrical linemen). The combination of flame retardancy and low density is also useful in furnishings, draperies, and outdoor fabrics.

Modacrylics are also commonly used in fake fur fabrics, toupées, wigs and fleece-type fabric. By mixing the various forms of fibers one can easily create a realistic synthetic fur. The fabrics can then be sheared or embossed to resemble fur even more closely. The heat-sensitivity of modacrylic also allows wigs and hairpieces to be curled and heat styled without damage.

Modacrylics are also used in fleece, knit-pile fabric backings, and nonwoven fabrics. Other uses of modacrylics include paint rollers, industrial fabrics, stuffed toys and filters.
