= Rubber toughening =

Rubber toughening is a process in which rubber nanoparticles are interspersed within a polymer matrix to increase the mechanical robustness, or toughness, of the material. By "toughening" a polymer it is meant that the ability of the polymeric substance to absorb energy and plastically deform without fracture is increased. Considering the significant advantages in mechanical properties that rubber toughening offers, most major thermoplastics are available in rubber-toughened versions; for many engineering applications, material toughness is a deciding factor in final material selection.

The effects of disperse rubber nanoparticles are complex and differ across amorphous and partly crystalline polymeric systems. Rubber particles toughen a system by a variety of mechanisms such as when particulates concentrate stress causing cavitation or initiation of dissipating crazes. However the effects are not one-sided; excess rubber content or debonding between the rubber and polymer can reduce toughness. It is difficult to state the specific effects of a given particle size or interfacial adhesion parameter due to numerous other confounding variables.

The presence of a given failure mechanism is determined by many factors: those intrinsic to the continuous polymer phase, and those that are extrinsic, pertaining to the stress, loading speed, and ambient conditions. The action of a given mechanism in a toughened polymer can be studied with microscopy. The addition of rubbery domains occurs via processes such as melt blending in a Rheomix mixer and atom-transfer radical-polymerization.

Current research focuses on how optimizing the secondary phase composition and dispersion affects mechanical properties of the blend. Questions of interest include those to do with fracture toughness, tensile strength, and glass transition temperature.

== Toughening mechanisms ==
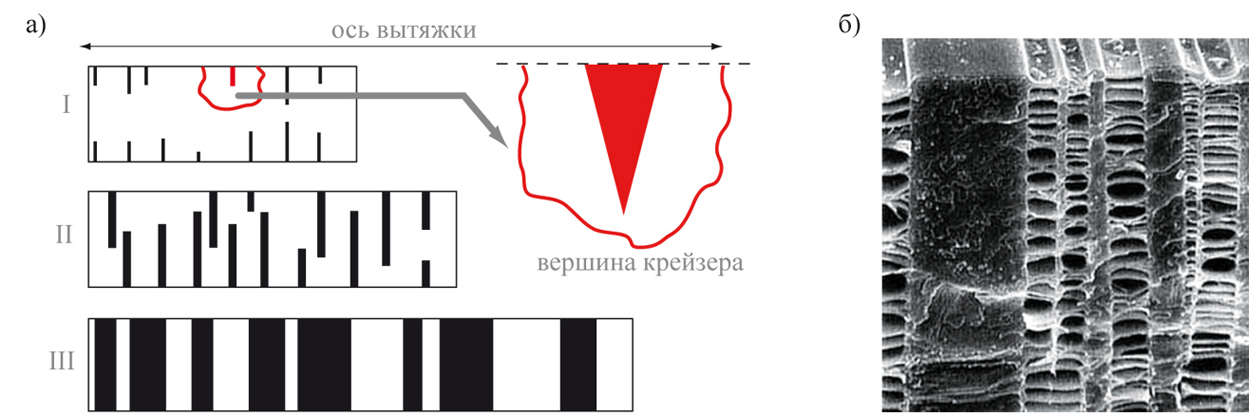
Crazing in polymers

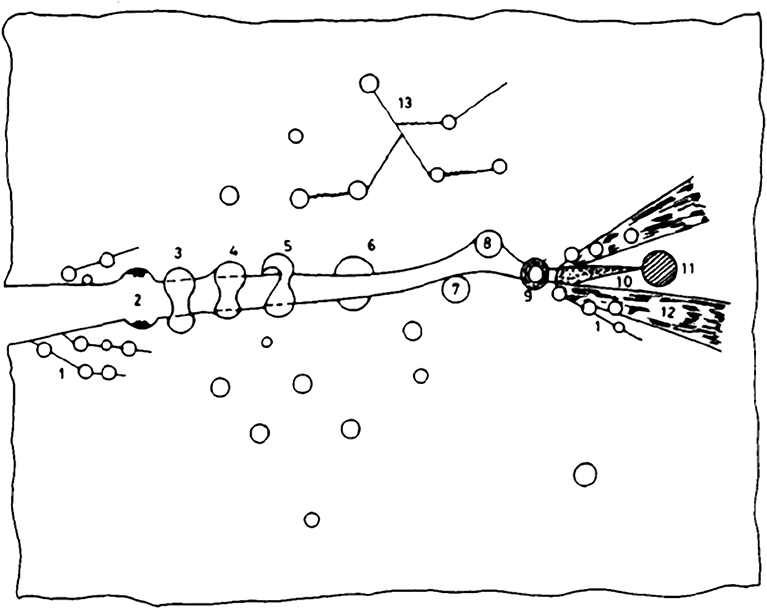
This is a cartoon representation of failure mechanisms in epoxy resins. The numbers correspond to the following. "(1) shear band formation, (2) fracture of rubber particles, (3) stretching, (4) debonding and (5) tearing of rubber particles, (6) transparticle fracture, (7) debonding of hard particles, (8) crack deflection by hard particles, (9) cavitated rubber particles, (10) crazing, (11) craze tip plastic deformation, (12) diffuse shear yielding, and (13) shear band/craze interaction [19]."

Different theories describe how a dispersed rubber phase toughens a polymeric substance; most employ methods of dissipating energy throughout the matrix. These theories include: microcrack theory, shear-yielding theory, multiple-crazing theory, shear band and crazing interaction theory, and more recently those including the effects of critical ligament thickness, critical plastic area, voiding and cavitation, damage competition and others.

=== Microcrack theory ===
In 1956, the microcrack theory became the first to explain the toughening effect of a dispersed rubber phase in a polymer. Two key observations that went into the initial theory and subsequent expansion were as follows: (1) microcracks form voids over which styrene-butadiene copolymer fibrils form to prevent propagation, and (2) energy stored during elongation of toughened epoxies is released upon breaking of rubber particles. The theory concluded that the combined energy to initiate microcracks and the energy to break rubber particles could account for the increased energy absorption of toughened polymers. This theory was limited, only accounting for a small fraction of the observed increase in fracture energy.

=== Matrix crazing ===
The matrix crazing theory focuses on explaining the toughening effects of crazing. Crazes start at the equator where principal strain is highest, propagate perpendicular to the stress, and end when they meet another particle. Crazes with perpendicular fibrils can eventually become a crack if the fibrils break. The volume expansion associated with small crazes distributed through a large volume compared to the small volume of a few large cracks in untoughened polymer accounts for a large fraction of the increase in fracture energy.

Interaction between rubber particles and crazes puts elongation pressures onto the particles in the direction of stress. If this force overcomes the surface adhesion between the rubber and polymer, debonding will occur, thereby diminishing the toughening effect associated with crazing. If the particle is harder, it will be less able to deform, and thus debonding occurs under less stress. This is one reason why dispersed rubbers, below their own glass transition temperature, do not toughen plastics effectively.

=== Shear yielding ===
Shear yielding theory is one that, like matrix crazing, can account for a large fraction of the increase in energy absorption of a toughened polymer. Evidence of shear yielding in a toughened polymer can be seen where there is "necking, drawing or orientation hardening." Shear yielding will result if rubber particles act as stress concentrators and initiate volume-expansion through crazing, debonding and cavitation, to halt the formation of cracks. Overlapping stress fields from one particle to its neighbor will contribute to a growing shear-yielding region. The closer the particles are the more overlap and the larger shear-yielding region. Shear yielding is an energy absorbing process in itself, but furthermore initiation of shear bands also aids in craze arrest. The occurrence of cavitation is important to shear yielding theory because it acts to lower the yield stress. Cavitation precedes shear yielding, however shear yielding accounts for a much larger increase in toughness than does the cavitation itself.

=== Cavitation ===
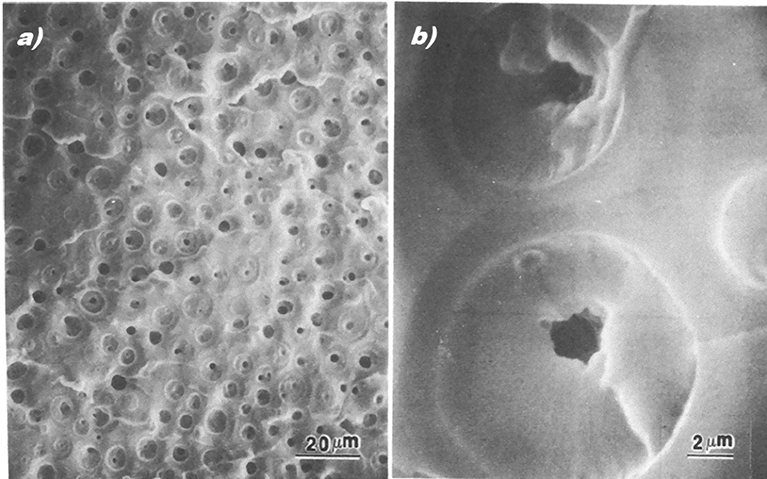
Image shows a fractured surface with voiding.

Cavitation is common in epoxy resins and other craze resistant toughened polymers, and is prerequisite to shearing in Izod impact strength testing. During the deformation and fracture of a toughened polymer, cavitation of the strained rubber particles occurs in crazing-prone and non-crazing-prone plastics, including, ABS, PVC, nylon, high impact polystyrene, and CTBN toughened epoxies. Engineers use an energy-balance approach to model how particle size and rubber modulus factors influence material toughness. Both particle size and modulus show positive correlation with brittle-tough transition temperatures. They are both shown to affect the cavitation process occurring at the crack tip process zone early in deformation, preceding large-scale crazing and shear yielding.

In order to show increased toughness under strain, the volumetric strain must overcome the energy of void formation as modeled by the equation:

$U_r(r) = \frac{2}{3}\pi R^3 K_r\Biggl(\Delta V_R - \frac{r^3}{R^3}\Biggl) + 4\pi r^3\Gamma + 2\pi r^3 G_r F(\lambda _\gamma)$

"where $G_r$ and $K_r$ are the shear modulus and bulk modulus of the rubber, $\Delta V_R$ is the volume strain in the rubber particle, $\Gamma$ is the surface energy of the rubber phase, and the function $F(\lambda_\gamma)$ is dependent on the failure strain of the rubber under biaxial stretching conditions."

The energy-balancing model applies the physical properties of the whole material to describe the microscopic behavior during triaxial stress. The volume stress and particle radius conditions for cavitation can be calculated, giving the theoretical minimum particle radius for cavitation, useful for practical applications in rubber toughening. Typically cavitation will occur when the average stress on the rubber particles is between 10 and 20 megapascal. The volume strain on the particle is relieved and voiding occurs. The energy absorption due to this increase in volume is theoretically negligible. Instead, it is the consequent shear band formation that accounts for increased toughness. Before debonding, as the strain increases, the rubber phases is forced to stretch further strengthening the matrix. Debonding between the matrix and the rubber reduces the toughness, creating the need for strong adhesion between the polymer and rubber phases.

=== Damage competition theory ===
The damage competition theory models the relative contributions of shear yielding and craze failure, when both are present. there are two main assumptions: crazing, microcracks, and cavitation dominate in brittle systems, and shearing dominates in the ductile systems. Systems that are in between brittle and ductile will show a combination of these. The damage competition theory defines the brittle-ductile transition as the point at which the opposite mechanism (shear or yield damage) appears in a system dominated by the other mechanism.

=== Characterization of failure ===
The dominant failure mechanism can usually be observed directly using TEM, SEM and light microscopy. If cavitation or crazing is dominant, tensile dilatometry (see dilatometer) can be used to measure the extent of the mechanism by measuring volume strain. However, if multiple dilatational mechanisms are present, it is difficult to measure the separate contributions. Shear yielding is a constant volume process and cannot be measured with tensile dilatometry. Voiding can be seen with optical microscopy, however one of two methods, using polarized light or low angle light scattering are necessary to observe the connection between cavitation and shear bands.

== Characteristics of the continuous phase relevant to toughening theory ==
In order to gauge the toughening effects of a dispersed secondary phase, it is important to understand the relevant characteristics of the continuous polymer phase. The mechanical failure characteristics of the pure polymeric continuous phase will strongly influence how rubber toughened polymer failure occurs. When a polymer usually fails due to crazing, rubber toughening particles will act as craze initiators. When it fails by shear yielding, the rubber particles will initiate shear bands. It is also possible to having multiple mechanisms come into play if the polymer is prone to failing by multiple stresses equally. Polystyrene and styrene-acrylonitrile are brittle materials that are prone to craze failure while polycarbonate, polyamides, and polyethylene terephthalate (PET) are prone to shear yield failure.

=== Glass transition temperature ===
Amorphous plastics are used below their glass transition temperature ($T_g$). They are brittle and notch sensitive but creep resistant. Molecules are immobile and the plastic responds to rapidly applied stress by fracturing. Partly crystalline thermoplastics are used for application in temperature conditions between $T_g$ and $T_m$ (melting temperature). Partly crystalline thermoplastics are tough and creep-prone because the amorphous regions surrounding the rigid crystals are afforded some mobility. Often they are brittle at room temperature because they have high glass transition temperatures. Polyethylene is tough at room temperature because its $T_g$ is lower than room temperature. Polyamide 66 and polyvinylchloride have secondary transitions below their $T_g$ that allows for some energy absorbing molecule mobility.

=== Chemical structure ===
There are some general guidelines to follow when trying to determine a plastic's toughness from its chemical structure. Vinyl polymers like polystyrene and styrene-acrylonitrile tend to fail by crazing. They have low crack initiation and propagation energies. Polymers with aromatic backbones, such as polyethylene terephthalate and polycarbonate, tend to fail by shear yielding with high crack initiation energy but low propagation energy. Other polymers, including poly(methyl methacrylate) and polyacetal(polyoxymethylene), are not as brittle as "brittle polymers" and are also not as ductile as "ductile polymers".

=== Entanglement density and flexibility of unperturbed real chain ===
The following equations relate the entanglement density $v_e$ and a measure of the flexibility of the unperturbed real chain ($C_\infty$) of a given plastic to its fracture mechanics:

$V_e = \frac {\rho_a}{3 M_v C_\infty ^2}$

Where $\rho_a$ is the mass density of the amorphous polymer, and $M_v$ is the average molecular weight per statistical unit. Crazing stress $(\sigma_z)$ is related to the entanglement density by:

$\sigma_z \varpropto v_e ^{1/2}$

The normalized stress yield is related to $C_\infty$ by

$log(\overline{\sigma}_y) \varpropto log(C_\infty) + c$

$c$ is a constant. The ratio of the crazing stress to the normalized stress yield is used to determine whether a polymer fails due to crazing or yield:

$\frac{\sigma_z}{\overline{\sigma}_y} \propto \biggl( \frac{\rho_a} {3M_v}\biggr)^{1/2}C_\infty ^ {-2}$

When the ratio is higher, the matrix is prone to yielding; when the ratio is lower, the matrix is prone to failure by crazing. These formulas form the base of crazing theory, shear-yielding theory, and damage competition theory.

== Relationship between the secondary phase properties and toughening effect ==
=== Rubber selection and miscibility with continuous phase ===
In material selection it is important to look at the interaction between the matrix and the secondary phase. For example, crosslinking within the rubber phase promotes high strength fibril formation that toughens the rubber, preventing particle fracture.

Carboxyl-terminated butadiene-acrylonitrile (CTBN) is often used to toughen epoxies, but using CTBN alone increases the toughness at the cost of stiffness and heat resistance. Amine-terminated butadiene acrylonitrile (ATBN) is also used. Using ultra-fine full-vulcanized powdered rubber (UFPR) researchers have been able to improve all three, toughness, stiffness, and heat resistance simultaneously, resetting the stage for rubber toughening with particles smaller than previously thought to be effective.

In applications where high optical transparency is necessary, examples being poly(methyl methacrylate) and polycarbonate it is important to find a secondary phase that does not scatter light. To do so it is important to match refractive indices of both phases. Traditional rubber particles do not offer this quality. Modifying the surface of nanoparticles with polymers of comparable refractive indices is an interest of current research.

=== Secondary phase concentration ===
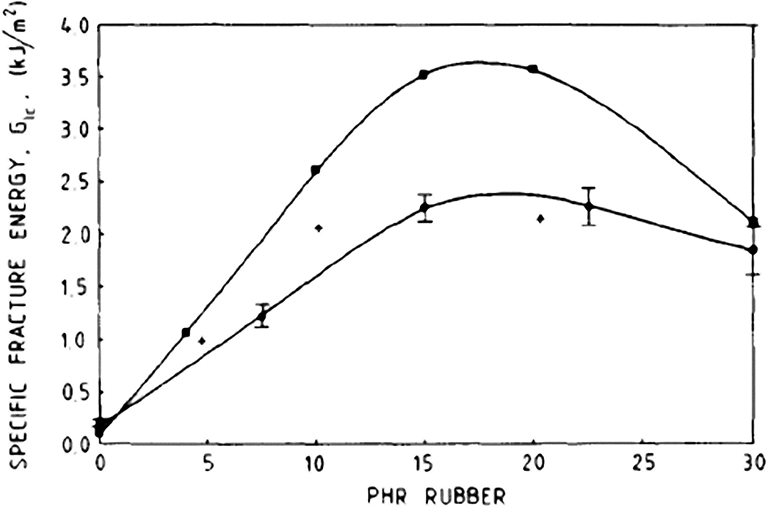
This shows the relationship between specific fracture energy and rubber concentration

Increasing the rubber concentration in a nanocomposite decreases the modulus and tensile strength. In one study, looking at PA6-EPDM blend, increasing the concentration of rubber up to 30 percent showed a negative linear relationship with the brittle-tough transition temperature, after which the toughness decreased. This suggests that the toughening effect of adding rubber particles is limited to a critical concentration. This is examined further in a study on PMMA from 1998; using SAXS to analyze crazing density, it was found that crazing density increases and yield stress decreases until the critical point when the relationship flips.

=== Rubber particle size ===
A material that is expected to fail by crazing is more likely to benefit from larger particles than a shear prone material, which would benefit from a smaller particle. In materials where crazing and yielding are comparable, a bimodal distribution of particle size may be useful for toughening. At fixed rubber concentrations, one can find that an optimal particle size is a function of the entanglement density of the polymer matrix. The neat polymer entanglement densities of PS, SAN, and PMMA are 0.056, 0.093, and 0.127 respectively. As entanglement density increases, the optimum particle size decreases linearly, ranging between 0.1 and 3 micrometers.

The effect of particle size on toughening is dependent on the type of test performed. This can be explained because for different test conditions, the failure mechanism changes. For impact strength testing on PMMA where failure occurs by shear-yielding, the optimum size of filler PBA-core PMMA-shell particle was shown in one case to be 250 nm. In the three-point bend test, where failure is due to crazing, 2000 nm particles had the most significant toughening effect.

=== Temperature effects ===
Temperature has a direct effect on the fracture mechanics. At low temperatures, below the glass transition temperature of the rubber, the dispersed phase behaves like a glass rather than like a rubber that toughens the polymer. As a result, the continuous phase fails by mechanisms characteristic of the pure polymer, as if the rubber was not present. As temperature increases past the glass transition temperature, the rubber phase increases the crack initiation energy. At this point the crack self-propagates due to the stored elastic energy in the material. As temperature rises further past the glass transition of the rubber phase, the impact strength of a rubber-polymer composite still dramatically increases as crack propagation requires additional energy input.

== Sample applications ==
=== Epoxy resins ===
Epoxy resins are a highly useful class of materials used in engineering applications. Some of these include use for adhesives, fiber-reinforced composites, and electronics coatings. Their rigidity and low crack propagation resistance makes epoxies a candidate of interest for rubber toughening research to fine-tune the toughening processes.

Some of the factors affecting the toughness of epoxy nanocomposites include the chemical identity of the epoxy curing agent, entanglement density, and interfacial adhesion. Curing epoxy 618 with piperidine, for example, produces tougher epoxies than when boron trifluoride-ethylamine is used. Low entanglement density increases the toughness. Bisphenol A can be added to lower the crosslinking density of epoxy 618, thereby increasing the fracture toughness. Bisphenol A and a rubber filler increase toughness synergistically.

In textbooks and literature before 2002 it was assumed that there is a lower limit for rubber-toughening particle diameter at 200 nm; it was then discovered that ultra-fine full-vulcanized powdered rubber particles with diameter of 90 nm show significant toughening of rubber epoxies. This finding underlines how this field is constantly growing and more work can be done to better model the rubber toughening effect.

=== ABS ===
Acrylonitrile butadiene styrene (ABS) polymer is an application of rubber toughening. The properties of this polymer come mainly from rubber toughening. The polybutadiene rubber domains in the main styrene-acrylonitrile matrix act as a stop to crack propagation.

=== Optically transparent plastics ===
PMMA’s high optical transparency, low cost, and compressibility make it a viable option for practical applications in architecture and car manufacturing as a substitute for glass when high transparency is necessary. Incorporating a rubber filler phase increases the toughness. Such fillers need to form strong interfacial bonds with the PMMA matrix. In applications where optical transparency is important, measures must be taken to limit light scattering.

It is common in toughening PMMA, and in other composites, to synthesize core-shell particles via atom-transfer radical-polymerization that have an outer polymer layer that has properties similar to those of the primary phase that increases the particle’s adhesion to the matrix. Developing PMMA compatible core-shell particles with low glass transition temperature while maintaining optical transparency is of interest to architects and car companies.

For optimal transparency the disperse rubber phase needs the following:

- Small average particle radius
- Narrow particle size distribution
- Refractive index matching that of matrix across range of temperatures and wavelengths
- Strong adhesion to matrix
- Similar viscosity to matrix at processing temperature

Cyclic olefin copolymer, an optically transparent plastic with low moisture uptake and solvent resistance among other useful properties, can be toughened effectively with a styrene-butadiene-styrene rubber with the above properties. The Notched-Izod strength more than doubled from 21 J/m to 57 J/m with an optical haze of 5%.

=== Improving polystyrene ===
Polystyrene generally has stiffness, transparency, processibility, and dielectric qualities that make it useful. However, its low impact resistance at low temperatures makes catastrophic fracture failure when cold more likely. The most widely used version of toughened polystyrene is called high impact polystyrene or HIPS. Being cheap and easy to thermoform (see thermoforming), it is utilized for many everyday uses. HIPS is made by polymerizing styrene in a polybutadiene rubber solution. After the polymerization reaction begins, the polystyrene and rubber phases separate. When phase separation begins, the two phases compete for volume until phase inversion occurs and the rubber can distribute throughout the matrix. The alternative emulsion polymerization with styrene-butadiene-styrene or styrene-butadiene copolymers allows fine-tuned manipulation of particle size distribution. This method makes use of the core-shell architecture.

In order to study the fracture microstructure of HIPS in a transmission electron microscope it is necessary to stain one of the phases with a heavy metal, Osmium tetroxide for example. This produces substantially different electron density between phases. Given a constant particle size, it is the cross-linking density that determines the toughness of a HIPS material. This can be measured by exploiting the negative relationship between the cis-polybutadiene content of the rubber and the crosslink density that can be measured with the swelling index. Lower crosslink density leads to increased toughness.

The generation of vast quantities of waste rubber from car tires has sparked interest in finding uses for this discarded rubber. The rubber can be turned into a fine powder, which can then be used as a toughening agent for polystyrene. However, poor miscibility between the waste rubber and polystyrene weakens the material. This problem requires the use of a compatibilizer (see compatibilization) in order to reduce interfacial tension and ultimately make rubber toughening of polystyrene effective. A polystyrene/styrene-butadiene copolymer acts to increase the adhesion between the dispersed and continuous phases.
