= Acrylonitrile =

Organic compound used in plastics manufacture

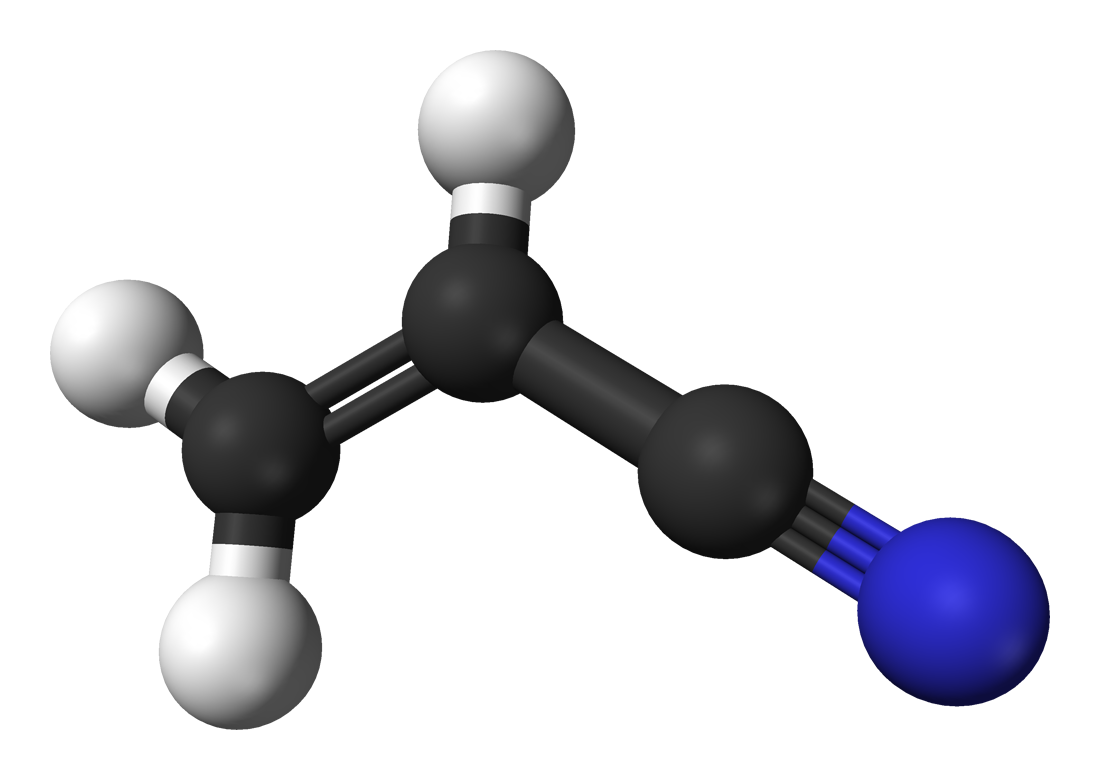

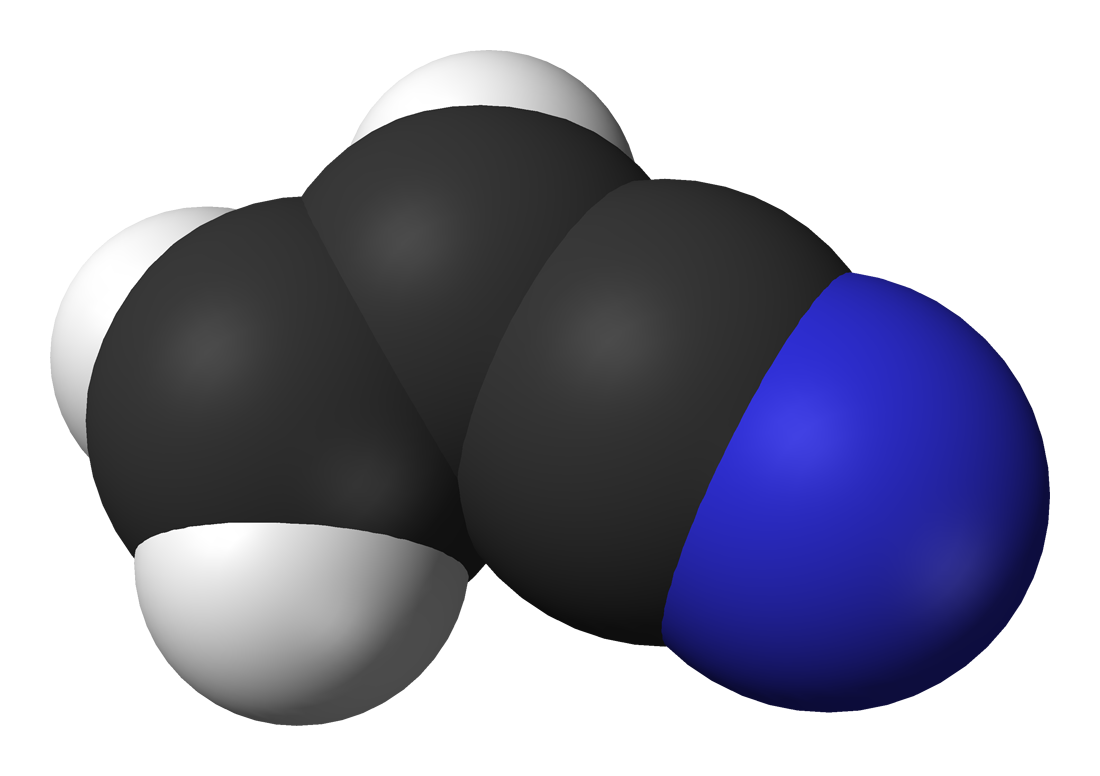

Names
- Preferred IUPAC name Prop-2-enenitrile
- Other names Acrylonitrile; 2-Propenenitrile; Cyanoethene; Vinyl cyanide (VCN); Cyanoethylene; Propenenitrile; Vinyl nitrile

Identifiers
CAS Number	107-13-1
3D model (JSmol)	Interactive image
ChEBI	CHEBI:28217
ChEMBL	ChEMBL445612
ChemSpider	7567
ECHA InfoCard	100.003.152
EC Number	608-003-00-4
KEGG	C01998
PubChem CID	7855
RTECS number	AT5250000
UNII	MP1U0D42PE
UN number	1093
CompTox Dashboard (EPA)	DTXSID5020029
- InChI: InChI=1S/C3H3N/c1-2-3-4/h2H,1H2 Key: NLHHRLWOUZZQLW-UHFFFAOYSA-N; InChI=1/C3H3N/c1-2-3-4/h2H,1H2 Key: NLHHRLWOUZZQLW-UHFFFAOYAG
- SMILES: N#CC=C

Properties
Chemical formula	C_{3}H_{3}N
Molar mass	53.064 g·mol^{−1}
Appearance	Colourless
Odor	Onion, garlic, pungent
Density	0.81 g/cm^{3}
Melting point	−84 °C (−119 °F; 189 K)
Boiling point	77 °C (171 °F; 350 K)
Solubility in water	70 g/L
Solubility	Very soluble in ethanol, acetone, benzene, ether
log P	0.19
Vapor pressure	83 mmHg
Henry's law constant (k_{H})	1.38×10^{−4} atm·m^{3}·mol^{-1}
Refractive index (n_{D})	1.3911 (20 °C)
Viscosity	0.34 mm^{2}/s

Thermochemistry
Std enthalpy of combustion (Δ_{c}H^{⦵}_{298})	1761.8 kJ/mol
Enthalpy of vaporization (Δ_{f}H_{vap})	32.6 kJ/mol

Hazards
- Occupational safety and health (OHS/OSH)
Main hazards	flammable potential occupational carcinogen
- GHS labelling
Pictograms	(GHS02: Flammable) (GHS05: Corrosive) (GHS06: Toxic) (GHS08: Health hazard) (GHS09: Environmental hazard)
Signal word	Danger
Hazard statements	H225, H301, H311, H315, H317, H318, H331, H335, H350, H411
Precautionary statements	P203, P210, P233, P240, P241, P242, P243, P261, P262, P264, P264+P265, P270, P271, P272, P273, P280, P301+P316, P302+P352, P303+P361+P353, P304+P340, P305+P354+P338, P316, P317, P318, P319, P321, P330, P333+P317, P361+P364, P362+P364, P370+P378, P391, P403+P233, P403+P235, P405, P501
NFPA 704 (fire diamond)	4 3 2
Flash point	−1 °C; 30 °F; 272 K
Autoignition temperature	471 °C (880 °F; 744 K)
Explosive limits	3–17%
- Lethal dose or concentration (LD, LC)
LC_{50} (median concentration)	500 ppm (rat, 4 h); 313 ppm (mouse, 4 h); 425 ppm (rat, 4 h)
LC_{Lo} (lowest published)	260 ppm (rabbit, 4 h); 575 ppm (guinea pig, 4 h); 636 ppm (rat, 4 h); 452 ppm (human, 1 h)
- NIOSH (US health exposure limits)
PEL (Permissible)	TWA 2 ppm C 10 ppm [15-minute] [skin]
REL (Recommended)	Ca TWA 1 ppm C 10 ppm [15-minute] [skin]
IDLH (Immediate danger)	85 ppm
Safety data sheet (SDS)	ICSC 0092

Related compounds
Related nitriles	acetonitrile propionitrile
Related compounds	acrylic acid acrolein
- Except where otherwise noted, data are given for materials in their standard state (at 25 °C [77 °F], 100 kPa). verify (what is ?) Infobox references

Acrylonitrile is an organic compound with the formula CH_{2}CHCN and the structure H_{2}C=CH−C≡N. It is a colorless, volatile liquid. It has a pungent odor reminiscent of garlic or onions. Its molecular structure consists of a vinyl group (−CH=CH_{2}) linked to a nitrile (−C≡N). It is an important monomer for the manufacture of useful plastics such as polyacrylonitrile. It is toxic at low doses.

Acrylonitrile is one of the components of ABS plastic (acrylonitrile butadiene styrene).

== Production ==
Acrylonitrile was first synthesized by the French chemist Charles Moureu in 1893. Acrylonitrile is produced by catalytic ammoxidation of propylene, also known as the SOHIO process. In 2002, world production capacity was estimated at 5 million tonnes per year, rising to about 6 million tonnes by 2017. Acetonitrile and hydrogen cyanide are significant byproducts that are recovered for sale. In fact, the 2008–2009 acetonitrile shortage was caused by a decrease in demand for acrylonitrile.

2 CH_{3}−CH=CH_{2} + 2 NH_{3} + 3 O_{2} → 2 CH_{2}=CH−C≡N + 6 H_{2}O

In the SOHIO process, propylene, ammonia, and air (oxidizer) are passed through a fluidized bed reactor containing the catalyst at 400–510 °C and 50–200 kPa_{g}. The reactants pass through the reactor only once, before being quenched in aqueous sulfuric acid. Excess propylene, carbon monoxide, carbon dioxide, and dinitrogen that do not dissolve are vented directly to the atmosphere, or are incinerated. The aqueous solution consists of acrylonitrile, acetonitrile, hydrocyanic acid, and ammonium sulfate (from excess ammonia). A recovery column removes bulk water, and acrylonitrile and acetonitrile are separated by distillation. One of the first useful catalysts was bismuth phosphomolybdate (Bi_{9}PMo_{12}O_{52}) supported on silica. Further improvements have since been made.

=== Alternative routes ===
Various green chemistry routes to acrylonitrile are being explored from renewable feedstocks, such as lignocellulosic biomass, glycerol (from biodiesel production), or glutamic acid (which can itself be produced from renewable feedstocks). The lignocellulosic route involves fermentation of the biomass to propionic acid and 3-hydroxypropionic acid, which are then converted to acrylonitrile by dehydration and ammoxidation. The glycerol route begins with its dehydration to acrolein, which undergoes ammoxidation to give acrylonitrile. The glutamic acid route employs oxidative decarboxylation to 3-cyanopropanoic acid, followed by a decarbonylation-elimination to acrylonitrile. Of these, the glycerol route is broadly considered to be the most viable, although none of these green methods are commercially competitive.

== Uses ==
Acrylonitrile is used principally as a monomer to prepare polyacrylonitrile, a homopolymer, or several important copolymers, such as styrene-acrylonitrile (SAN), acrylonitrile butadiene styrene (ABS), acrylonitrile styrene acrylate (ASA), and other synthetic rubbers such as acrylonitrile butadiene (NBR). Hydrodimerization of acrylonitrile affords adiponitrile, used in the synthesis of certain nylons:

2 CH_{2}=CHCN + 2 e^{−} + 2 H^{+} → NCCH_{2}−CH_{2}−CH_{2}−CH_{2}CN

Hydrolysis with sulfuric acid gives acrylamide sulfate, CH=CHC(O)NH_{2}·H_{2}SO_{4}. This salt can be converted to acrylamide and to methyl acrylate. Hydrogenation of acrylonitrile is one route to propionitrile. The reaction of acrylonitrile with protic nucleophiles is called cyanoethylation:

YH + H_{2}C=CHCN → Y−CH_{2}−CH_{2}CN

Typical protic nucleophiles are alcohols, thiols, and especially amines. When hydrogen cyanide is used the product is succinonitrile.

Acrylonitrile and derivatives, such as 2-chloroacrylonitrile, are dienophiles in Diels–Alder reactions.

== Health effects ==
Acrylonitrile is toxic with LD50 = 81 mg/kg (rats). It can polymerize explosively. The burning material releases fumes of hydrogen cyanide and oxides of nitrogen. It is classified as a Class 1 carcinogen (carcinogenic) by the International Agency for Research on Cancer (IARC), and workers exposed to high levels of airborne acrylonitrile are diagnosed more frequently with lung cancer than the rest of the population.

Acrylonitrile appears to cause oxidative stress and oxidative DNA damage. Acrylonitrile increases cancer in high dose tests in male and female rats and mice and induces apoptosis in human umbilical cord mesenchymal stem cells.

It evaporates quickly at room temperature (20 °C) to reach dangerous concentrations; skin irritation, respiratory irritation, and eye irritation are the immediate effects of this exposure. Pathways of exposure for humans include emissions, auto exhaust, and cigarette smoke that can expose the human subject directly if they inhale or smoke. Routes of exposure include inhalation, oral, and to a certain extent dermal uptake (tested with volunteer humans and in rat studies). Repeated exposure causes skin sensitization and may cause central nervous system and liver damage.

Acrylonitrile is excreted in urine as a conjugate to glutathione. Some acrylonitrile is enzymatically converted into 2-cyanoethylene oxide, which produces cyanide and thiocyanate, which also are excreted in urine. Exposure can thus be detected via blood draws and urine sampling.

In July 2024, the International Agency for Research on Cancer upgraded acrylonitrile's classification from 'possibly carcinogenic' to carcinogenic for humans. The Agency found sufficient evidence linking it to lung cancer.

=== Use in plastic bottles ===
In June 1974 Coca-Cola introduced the acrylonitrile/styrene 32oz Easy‐Goer plastic bottle, offering energy savings during manufacture, increased durability, and weight savings over glass. In March 1977 after a suit filed by the Natural Resources Defense Council the FDA rescinded approval of acrylonitrile bottles citing adverse effects on test animals. Monsanto, Coca-Cola's bottle manufacturer, refuted the decision, stating "repeated tests have demonstrated that there is no detectable migration of acrylonitrile into the bottle's content." After several appeals in court by September 1977 the FDA finalized their ban.

=== Incidents ===
A large amount of acrylonitrile (approximately 6500 tons) leaked from an industrial polymer plant owned by Aksa Akrilik after the violent 17 August 1999 earthquake in Turkey. Over 5000 people were affected and the exposed animals had died. The leak was only noticed by the company 8 hours after the incident. Healthcare workers did not know about the health effects of acrylonitrile and tried to treat the victims with painkillers and IV fluids. One lawyer, Ayşe Akdemir, sued the company with 44 families as the plaintiffs. Aksa Akrilik was sued by 200 residents who were affected by acrylonitrile. An increase in cancer cases in the area was confirmed by the Turkish Medical Association, as the cancer rate in the affected area has increased by 80%, from 1999 to April 2002. In 2003, the owner of Aksa Akrilik died from lung cancer related to acrylonitrile exposure.

== Occurrence ==
Microorganisms containing nitrile hydratase enzymes (NHase) degrade harmful acrylonitrile.

Acrylonitrile has been detected at the sub-ppm level at industrial sites. It persists in the air for up to a week. It decomposes by reacting with oxygen and hydroxyl radical to form formyl cyanide and formaldehyde. Acrylonitrile is harmful to aquatic life. Acrylonitrile has been detected in the atmosphere of Titan, a moon of Saturn. Computer simulations suggest that on Titan conditions exist such that the compound could form structures similar to cell membranes and vesicles on Earth, called azotosomes.
