= Acrylonitrile butadiene styrene =

Thermoplastic polymer

- Monomers in ABS polymer

- A subset of common crosslinking motifs in ABS

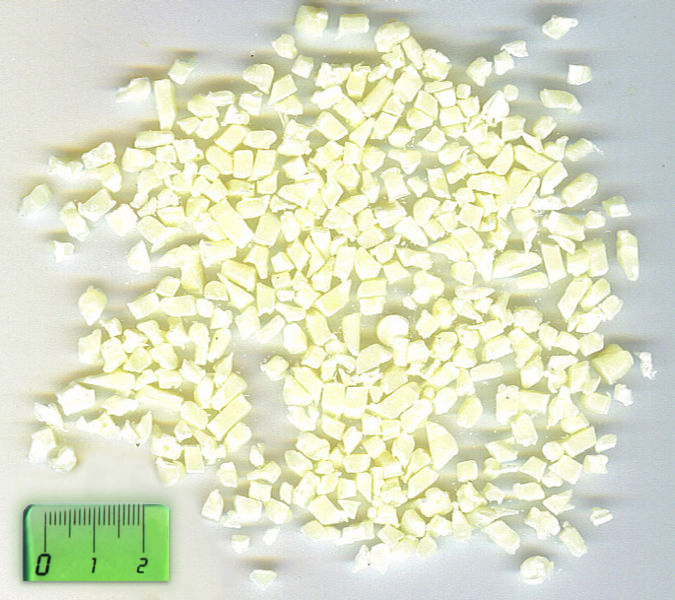
- ABS polymer grains

Identifiers
CAS Number	9003-56-9
ChemSpider	None
ECHA InfoCard	100.127.708
PubChem CID	24756
CompTox Dashboard (EPA)	DTXSID70858757

Properties
Chemical formula	(C_{8}H_{8}·C_{4}H_{6}·C_{3}H_{3}N)_{n}
Density	1.060–1.080 g/cm^{3}
Solubility in water	Insoluble in water

Related compounds
Related compounds	Acrylonitrile, butadiene and styrene (monomers)
- Except where otherwise noted, data are given for materials in their standard state (at 25 °C [77 °F], 100 kPa). verify (what is ?) Infobox references

Acrylonitrile butadiene styrene (ABS; chemical formula (C_{8}H_{8})_{x}·(C_{4}H_{6})_{y}·(C_{3}H_{3}N)_{z}) is a thermoplastic polymer, in common use since the 1950s. At room temperature it is an amorphous solid and has no definitive melting point, due to the varying length of monomer chains and various degrees of cross-linking. Its glass transition temperature is approximately 105 °C (221 °F).

ABS is a terpolymer made by polymerizing styrene and acrylonitrile in the presence of polybutadiene. The proportions can vary from 15% to 35% acrylonitrile, 5% to 30% butadiene and 40% to 60% styrene. The result is a long chain of polybutadiene crisscrossed with shorter chains of poly(styrene-co-acrylonitrile). The nitrile groups from neighboring chains, being polar, attract each other and bind the chains together, making ABS stronger than pure polystyrene. The acrylonitrile also contributes chemical resistance, fatigue resistance, hardness, and rigidity, while increasing the heat deflection temperature. The styrene gives the plastic a shiny, impervious surface, as well as hardness, rigidity, and improved processing ease. The polybutadiene, a rubbery substance, provides toughness and ductility at low temperatures, at the cost of heat resistance and rigidity. For the majority of applications, ABS can be used between −20 and 80 °C (−4 and 176 °F), as its mechanical properties vary with temperature. The properties are created by rubber toughening, where fine particles of elastomer are distributed throughout the rigid matrix.

== Properties ==
ABS provides favorable mechanical properties such as impact resistance, toughness, and rigidity when compared with other common polymers. A variety of modifications can be made to improve impact resistance, toughness, and heat resistance. The impact resistance can be amplified by increasing the proportions of polybutadiene in relation to styrene and also acrylonitrile, although this causes changes in other properties. Impact resistance does not fall off rapidly at lower temperatures. Stability under load is excellent with limited loads. Thus, by changing the proportions of its components, ABS can be prepared in different grades. Two major categories could be ABS for extrusion and ABS for injection molding, then high and medium impact resistance. ABS would have useful characteristics within a temperature range from −20 to 80 °C (−4 to 176 °F).

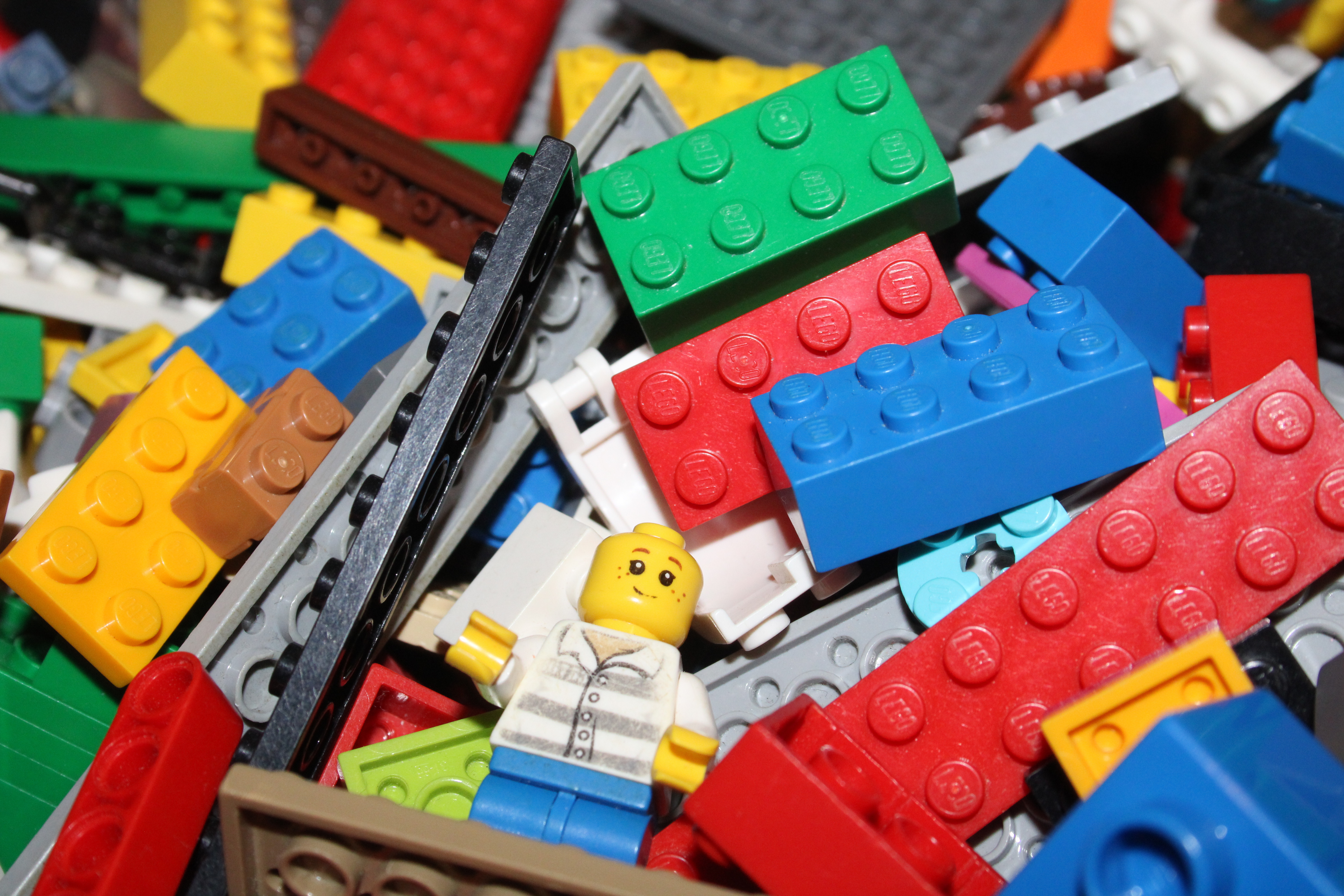
Certain Lego bricks are made from ABS.

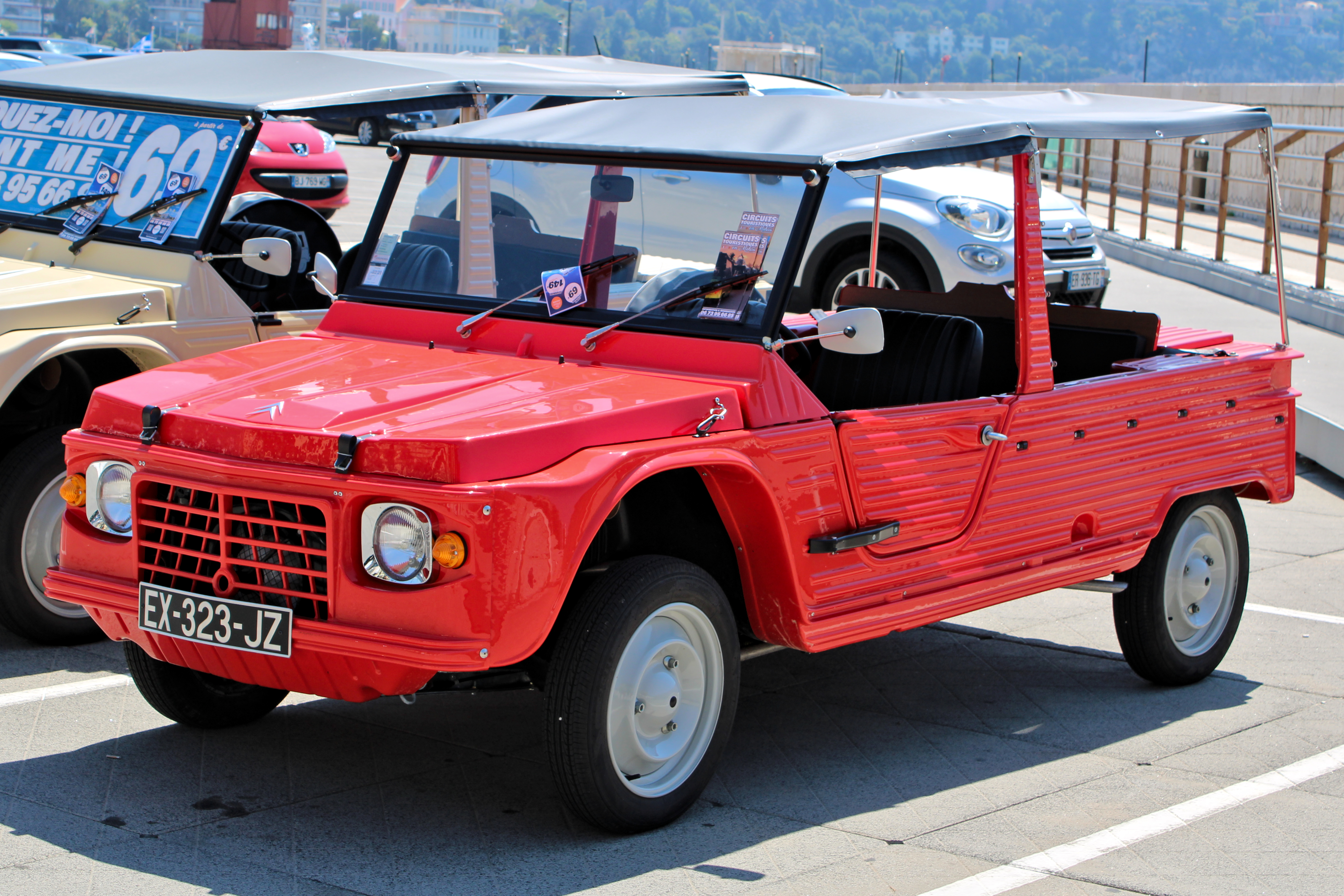
The Citroën Méhari's body panels are made from ABS.

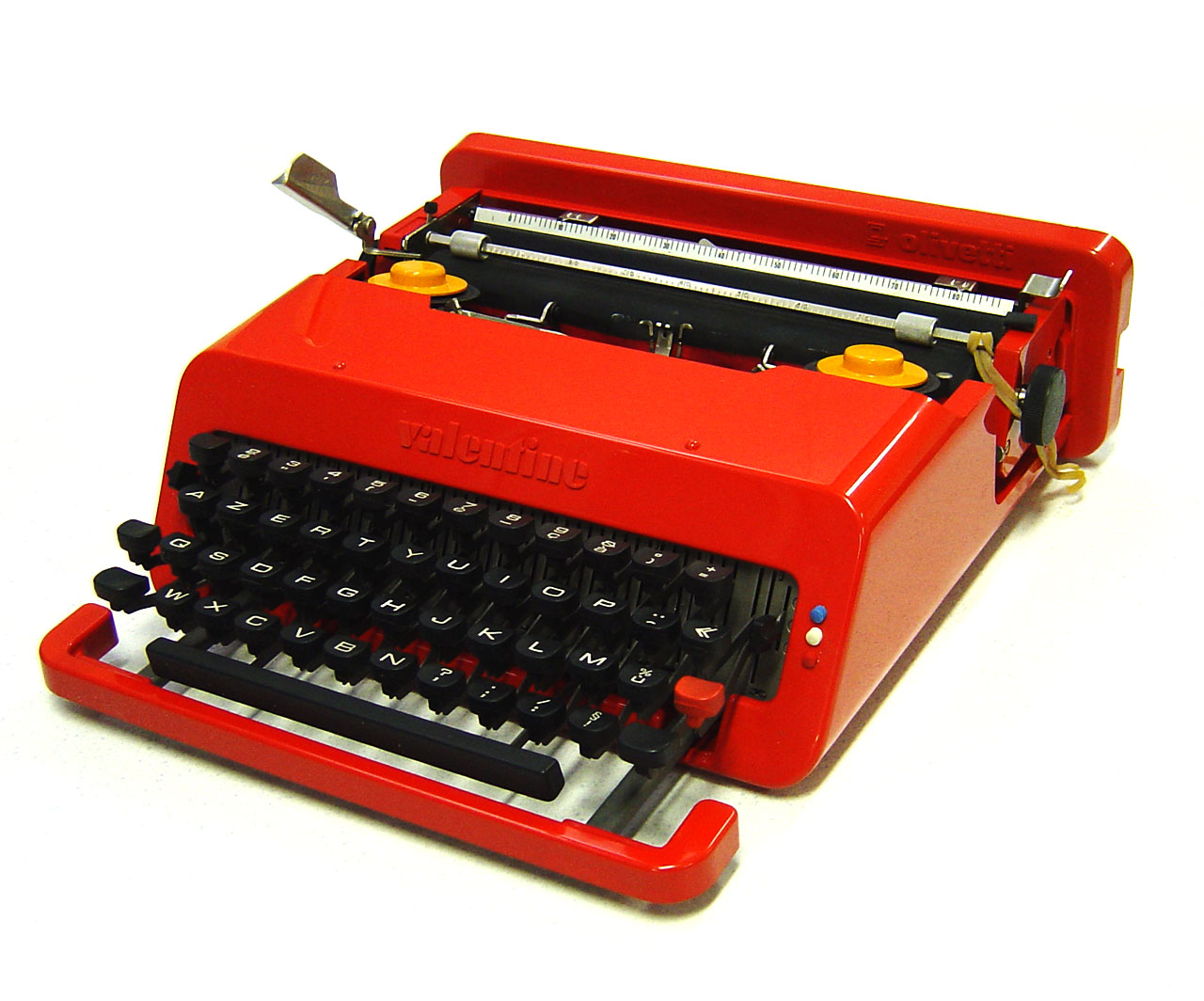
The Olivetti Valentine, designed by Ettore Sottsass

The final properties will be influenced to some extent by the conditions under which the material is processed to the final product. For example, molding at a high temperature improves the gloss and heat resistance of the product whereas the highest impact resistance and strength are obtained by molding at low temperature. Fibers (usually glass fibers) and additives can be mixed in the resin pellets to make the final product strong and raise the maximum operating temperature as high as 80 °C (176 °F). Pigments can also be added, as the raw material's original color is translucent ivory to white. The aging characteristics of the polymers are largely influenced by the polybutadiene content, and it is normal to include antioxidants in the composition. Other factors include exposure to ultraviolet radiation, which additives are also available to protect against.

ABS polymers are resistant to aqueous acids, alkalis, concentrated hydrochloric and phosphoric acids and animal, vegetable and mineral oils, but they are swollen by glacial acetic acid, carbon tetrachloride and aromatic hydrocarbons and are attacked by concentrated sulfuric and nitric acids. They are soluble in esters, ketones (such as acetone), chloroform, and ethylene dichloride. They also offer poor resistance to chlorinated solvents, alcohols and aldehydes.

Even though ABS plastics are used largely for mechanical purposes, they also have electrical properties that are fairly constant over a wide range of frequencies. These properties are little affected by temperature and atmospheric humidity in the acceptable operating range of temperatures.

ABS is flammable when it is exposed to high temperatures, such as those of a wood fire. It will melt and then boil, at which point the vapors burst into intense, hot flames. Since pure ABS contains no halogens, its combustion does not typically produce any persistent organic pollutants, and the most toxic products of its combustion or pyrolysis are carbon monoxide and hydrogen cyanide. ABS is also damaged by sunlight; this caused one of the most widespread and expensive automobile recalls in US history due to the degradation of the seatbelt release buttons.

ABS can be recycled, although it is not accepted by all recycling facilities.

=== Mechanical properties ===
ABS is one of many types of thermoplastic with biomedical applications, with injection-molded components being easy to manufacture for single use. It can be sterilized by gamma radiation or ethylene oxide (EtO).

Typical mechanical properties of ABS
Property	Value
Young's modulus	2.28 GPa
Tensile strength	43 MPa
Flexural modulus	2.48 GPa
Flexural strength	77 MPa
Notched Izod	0.203 kJ/m
Heat deflection temperature, 1.81 MPa	81 °C

Yellowing in ABS plastic occurs when it is exposed to UV light or excessive heat, which causes photo-oxidation of polymers that breaks polymer chains and causes the plastic to yellow and become brittle.

=== Transparent ABS (MABS) ===
Most ABS is opaque because its components have different refractive indices. Acrylonitrile and styrene make ABS stiff. Butadiene particles are elastic and make ABS impact resistant. Adding methyl methacrylate (MMA) helps to bring the refractive indices closer together, making it transparent, while reducing the product's impact resistance compared to impact grades of ABS. However, the resulting MABS product can still outperform polystyrene, SAN and PMMA (acrylic) for impact resistance.

== Production ==
ABS is derived from acrylonitrile, butadiene, and styrene. Acrylonitrile is a synthetic monomer produced from propylene and ammonia; butadiene is a petroleum hydrocarbon obtained from the C4 fraction of steam cracking; styrene monomer is made by dehydrogenation of ethylbenzene, a hydrocarbon obtained in the reaction of ethylene and benzene.

According to the European plastic trade association PlasticsEurope, industrial production of 1 kg (2.2 lb) of ABS resin in Europe uses an average of 95.34 MJ (26.48 kW⋅h) and is derived from natural gas and petroleum.

== Machining ==
ABS is manufactured in a variety of grades, but for precision machining of ABS structural parts, it is recommended to use Machine Grade ABS. Machine Grade ABS is easily machined via standard techniques, including turning, drilling, milling, and sawing. ABS parts can be welded together by heating the joint surfaces until they begin to melt; reinforcement can be applied to such a joint by melting a thin ABS rod. ABS parts can also be chemically affixed to each other, and to other sufficiently similar plastics, by means of solvents.

== Applications ==
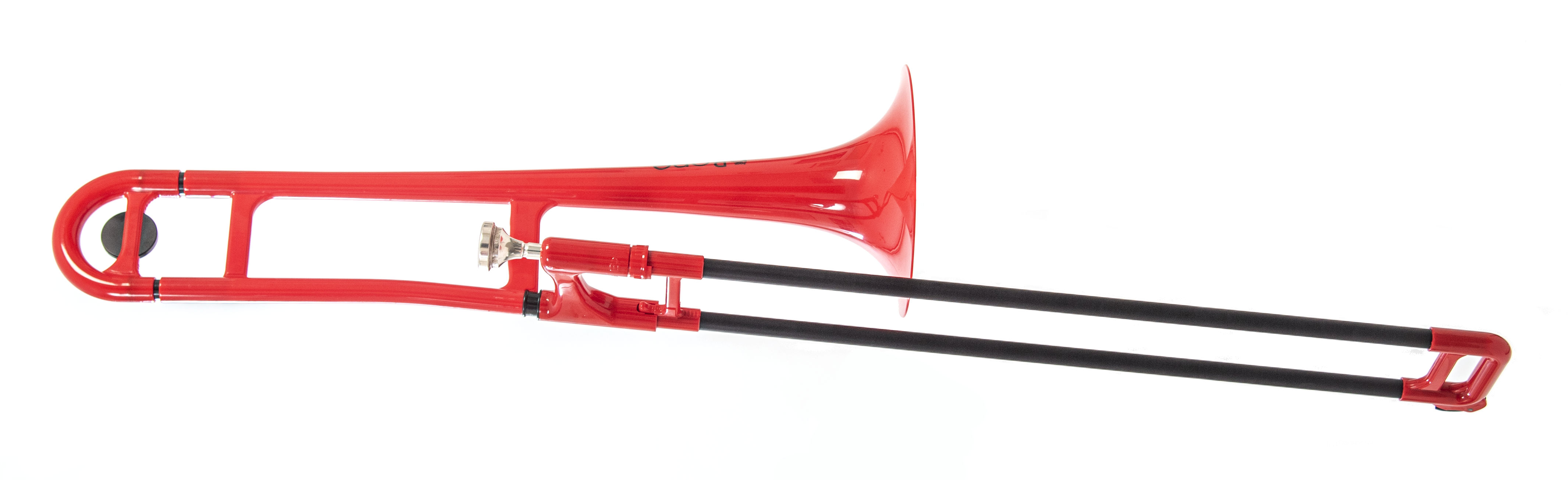
A "pBone" trombone made from ABS

ABS was patented in 1948 and introduced to commercial markets by the Borg-Warner Corporation in 1954.

ABS's light weight and ability to be injection molded and extruded make it useful in manufacturing products such as drain-waste-vent (DWV) pipe systems. Musical instruments such as plastic recorders, oboes, clarinets, and trombones, and some parts for piano actions, are commonly made out of ABS, as are computer keyboard keycaps.

Other uses include golf club heads (because of its good shock absorbance), automotive trim components, automotive bumper bars, binoculars and monoculars, inhalers, nebulizers, non-absorbable sutures, tendon prostheses, drug-delivery systems tracheal tubes, enclosures for electrical and electronic assemblies (such as computer cases), protective headgear, whitewater canoes, buffer edging for furniture and joinery panels, luggage and protective carrying cases, pen housings, and small kitchen appliances. Toys, including LEGO (Lego bricks have primarily been made from ABS since 1963) and Kre-O bricks, are a common application.

ABS plastic ground down to an average diameter of less than 1 micrometer is used as the colorant in some tattoo inks.

=== 3D printing ===
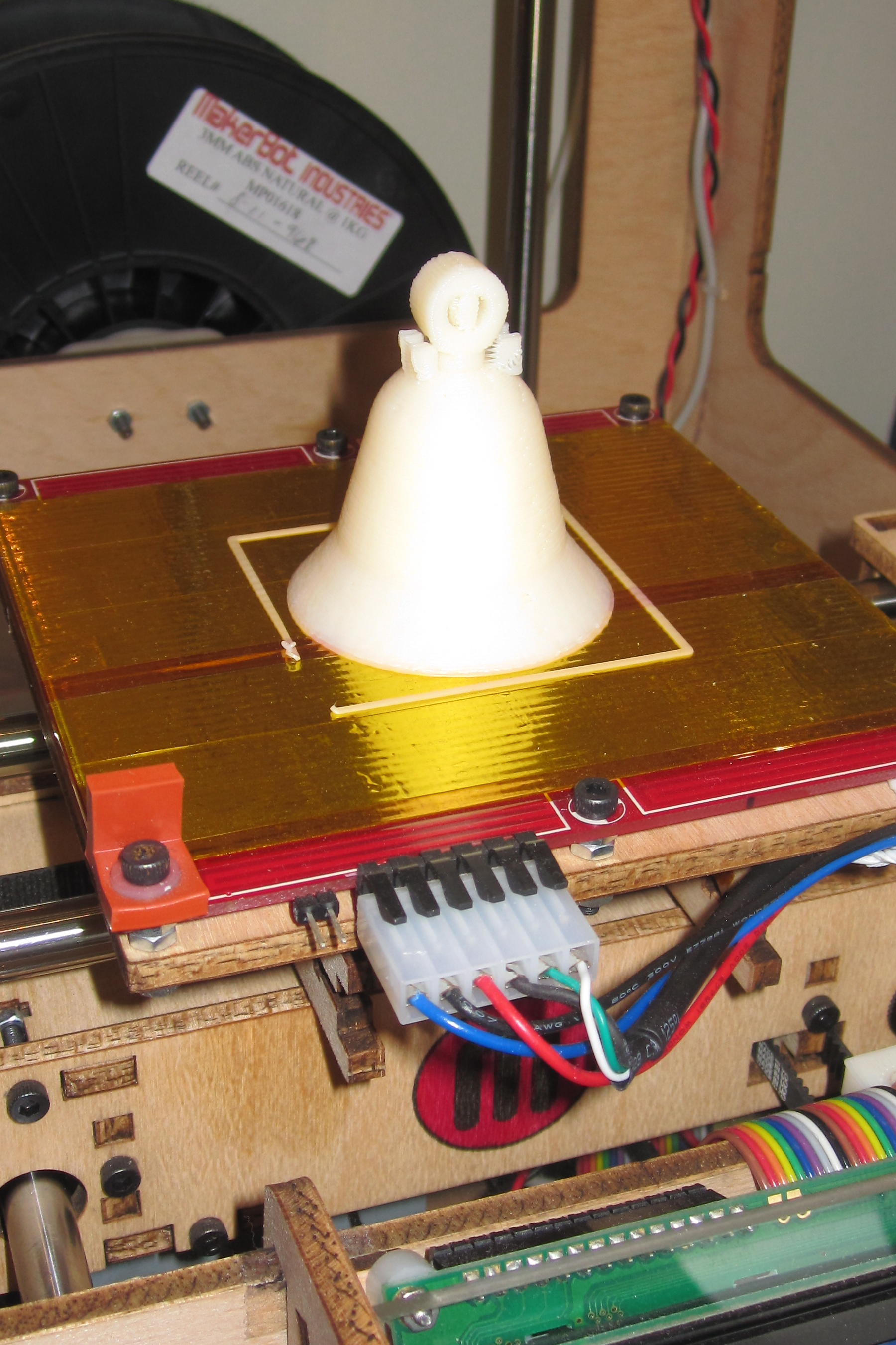
An ABS bell manufactured with a 3D printer

When extruded into a filament, ABS plastic is a common material used in 3D printers, as it is cheap, strong, has high stability and can be post-processed in various ways (sanding, painting, gluing, filling and chemical smoothing). When being used in a 3D printer, ABS is known to warp due to shrinkage that occurs while cooling during the printing process. The shrinking can be reduced by printing inside an enclosure on a heated print surface, using an adhesive such as a glue stick or hairspray to ensure the first layer of the print is well stuck to the print surface, or printing with a brim/raft at the base of the print to help increase adhesion to the print surface. ABS is only used in FFF/FDM 3D printers, as resin 3D printers cannot melt plastic.

Particular forms of ABS filaments are ABS-ESD (electrostatic discharge) and ABS-FR (fire resistant), which are used in particular for the production of electrostatically sensitive components and refractory prefabricated parts.

==== Pens ====
ABS plastic is also used in the manufacture of the Lamy Safari fountain pen due to its hard and relative strength.

== Hazard to humans ==
ABS is stable to decomposition under normal use and polymer processing conditions. Exposure to carcinogens due to normal use and processing is well below workplace exposure limits. However, if the temperature reaches 400 °C (750 °F), ABS can decompose into its constituents: butadiene, acrylonitrile, and styrene (all of which are carcinogenic to humans). Even at ambient temperatures, a possible concern may be for which applications of this plastic contain added fire retardants such as decabromodiphenylethane, which is still approved for use at least in the United States.

Ultrafine particles (UFPs) may be produced at lower temperatures (such as in 3D printing). Concerns have been raised regarding airborne UFP concentrations generated while 3D printing with ABS, as UFPs have been linked with adverse health effects, some of which may result from tissue obstruction in the kidneys, lungs, and intestines caused by a buildup of UFPs.

== See also ==
- Polylactic acid (PLA) – another plastic used for 3D printing
- Retrobright – a process for reversing the yellowing of white ABS plastic casings
