= Styrene-acrylonitrile resin =

Styrene acrylonitrile

Names
- Other names SAN

Identifiers
CAS Number	9003-54-7
ChemSpider	none
ECHA InfoCard	100.127.519
EC Number	618-369-7
CompTox Dashboard (EPA)	DTXSID50895140

Properties
Chemical formula	(C_{8}H_{8})_{n}-(C_{3}H_{3}N)_{m}
Molar mass	variable
- Except where otherwise noted, data are given for materials in their standard state (at 25 °C [77 °F], 100 kPa). verify (what is ?) Infobox references

Styrene acrylonitrile resin (SAN) is a copolymer plastic consisting of styrene and acrylonitrile. It is widely used in place of polystyrene owing to its greater thermal resistance. The chains of between 70 and 80% by weight styrene and 20 to 30% acrylonitrile. Larger acrylonitrile content improves mechanical properties and chemical resistance, but also adds a yellow tint to the normally transparent plastic.

== Properties and uses ==
SAN is similar in use to polystyrene. Like polystyrene itself, it is transparent and brittle. The copolymer has a glass transition temperature greater than 100 °C owing to the acrylonitrile units in the chain, thus making the material resistant to boiling water. It is structurally related to ABS plastic, where polybutadiene is copolymerised with SAN to give a much tougher material. The rubber chains form separate phases which are 10-20 micrometers in diameter. When the product is stressed, crazing from the particles helps to increase the strength of the polymer. The method of rubber toughening has been used to strengthen other polymers such as PMMA and nylon.

Uses include food containers, water bottles, kitchenware, e.g., blenders and mixers, healthcare materials, cosmetic jars, computer products, packaging material, household equipment e.g., shower trays, battery cases and plastic optical fibers.
