= Recycling =

Converting waste materials into new products

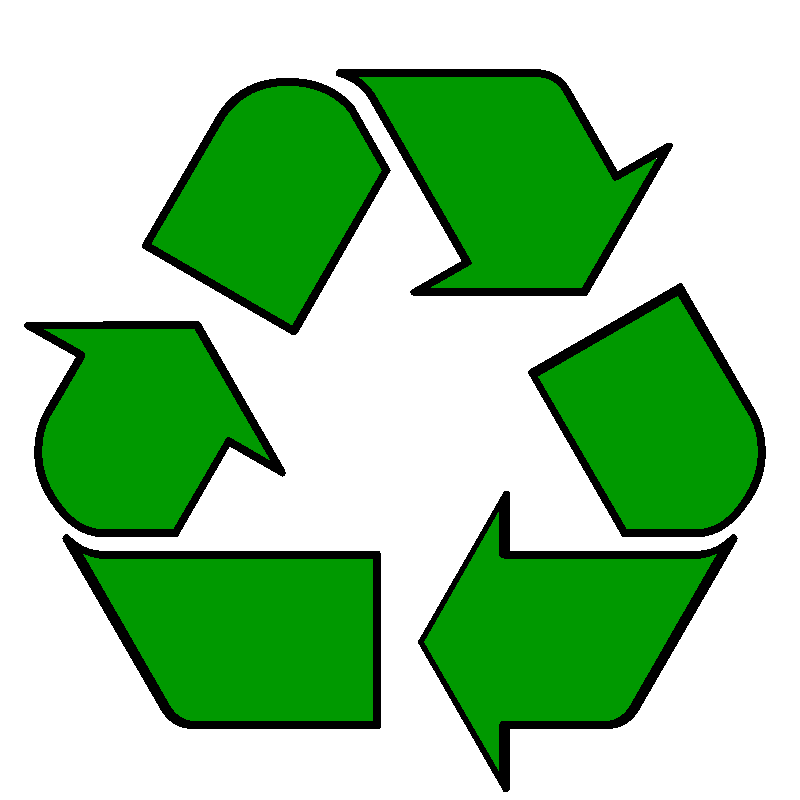
The three chasing arrows of the universal recycling symbol

Municipal waste recycling rate (%), 2015

Recycling is the process of converting waste materials into new materials and objects. This concept often includes the recovery of energy from waste materials. The recyclability of a material depends on its ability to reacquire the properties it had in its original state. It is an alternative to "conventional" waste disposal that can save material and help lower greenhouse gas emissions. It can also prevent the waste of potentially useful materials and reduce the consumption of fresh raw materials, reducing energy use, air pollution (from incineration) and water pollution (from landfilling).

Recycling is a key component of modern waste reduction and represents the third step in the "Reduce, Reuse, and Recycle" waste hierarchy, contributing to environmental sustainability and resource conservation. It promotes environmental sustainability by removing raw material input and redirecting waste output in the economic system. There are some ISO standards related to recycling, such as ISO 15270:2008 for plastics waste and ISO 14001:2015 for environmental management control of recycling practice.

Recyclable materials include many kinds of glass, paper, cardboard, metal, plastic, tires, textiles, batteries, and electronics. The composting and other reuse of biodegradable waste—such as food and garden waste—is also a form of recycling. Materials for recycling are either delivered to a household recycling center or picked up from curbside bins, then sorted, cleaned, and reprocessed into new materials for manufacturing new products.

In ideal implementations, recycling a material produces a fresh supply of the same material—for example, used office paper would be converted into new office paper, and used polystyrene foam into new polystyrene. Some types of materials, such as metal cans, can be remanufactured repeatedly without losing their purity. With other materials, this is often difficult or too expensive (compared with producing the same product from raw materials or other sources), so "recycling" of many products and materials involves their reuse in producing different materials (for example, paperboard). Another form of recycling is the salvage of constituent materials from complex products, due to either their intrinsic value (such as lead from car batteries and gold from printed circuit boards), or their hazardous nature (e.g. removal and reuse of mercury from thermometers and thermostats).

== History ==
During periods when resources were scarce, archaeological studies of ancient waste dumps show less household waste (such as ash, broken tools, and pottery), implying that more waste was recycled in place of new material. However, archaeological artefacts made from recyclable material, such as glass or metal, may neither be the original object nor resemble it, with the consequence that a successful ancient recycling economy can become invisible when recycling is synonymous with re-melting rather than reuse.

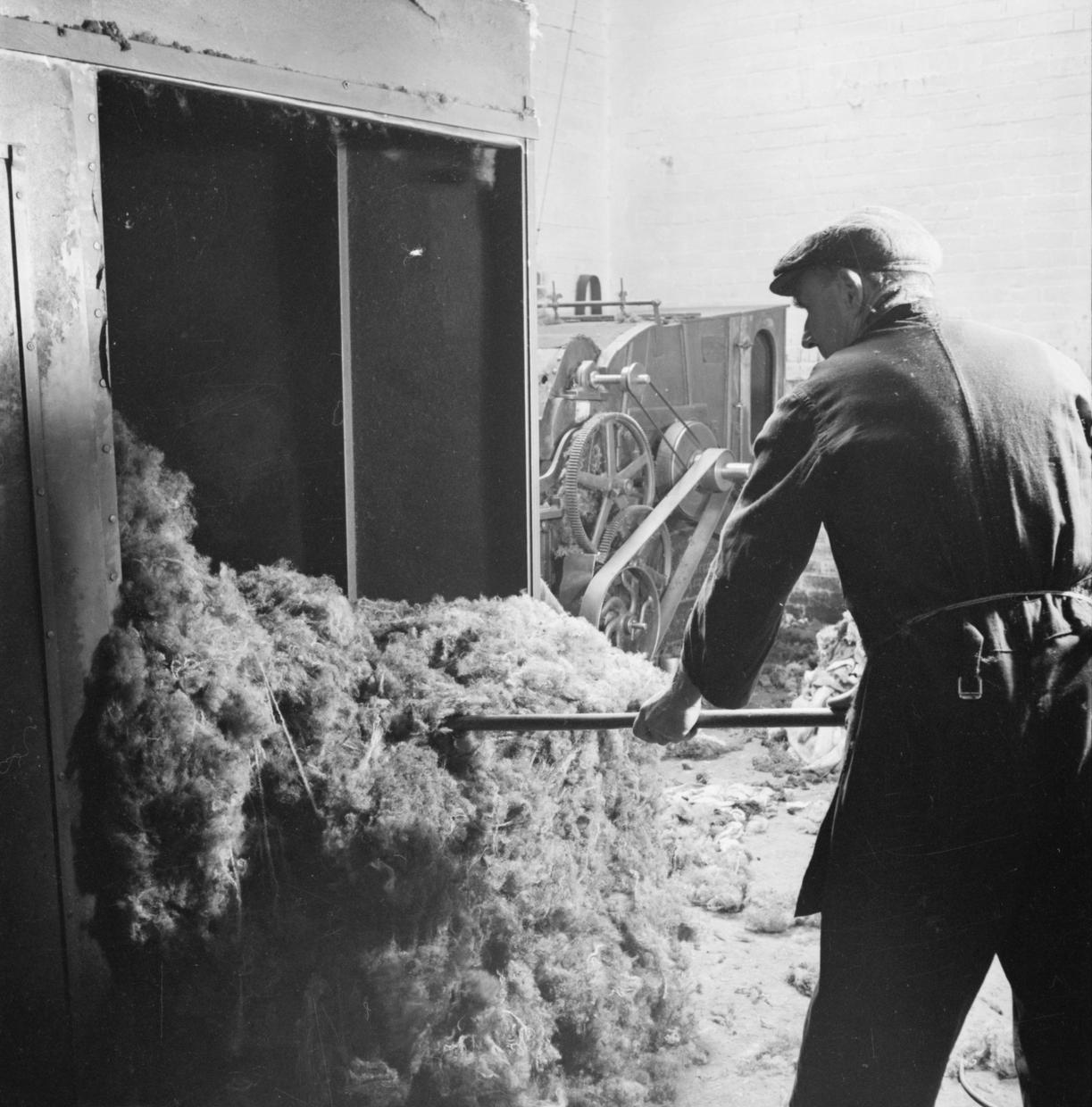
Inside a British factory, a textile worker rakes newly made 'shoddy' which was then combined with new wool to make new cloth

In pre-industrial times, there is evidence of scrap bronze and other metals being collected in Europe and melted down for continuous reuse. Paper recycling was first recorded in 1031 when Japanese shops sold repulped paper. In Britain dust and ash from wood and coal fires was collected by "dustmen" and downcycled as a base material for brick making. These forms of recycling were driven by the economic advantage of obtaining recycled materials instead of virgin material, and the need for waste removal in ever-more-densely populated areas. In 1813, Benjamin Law developed the process of turning rags into "shoddy" and "mungo" wool in Batley, Yorkshire, which combined recycled fibers with virgin wool. The West Yorkshire shoddy industry in towns such as Batley and Dewsbury lasted from the early 19th century to at least 1914.

Industrialization spurred demand for affordable materials. In addition to rags, ferrous scrap metals were coveted as they were cheaper to acquire than virgin ore. Railroads purchased and sold scrap metal in the 19th century, and the growing steel and automobile industries purchased scrap in the early 20th century. Many secondary goods were collected, processed and sold by peddlers who scoured dumps and city streets for discarded machinery, pots, pans, and other sources of metal. By World War I, thousands of such peddlers roamed the streets of American cities, taking advantage of market forces to recycle post-consumer materials into industrial production.

Manufacturers of beverage bottles, including Schweppes, began offering refundable recycling deposits in Great Britain and Ireland around 1800. An official recycling system with refundable deposits for bottles was established in Sweden in 1884, and for aluminum beverage cans in 1982; it led to recycling rates of 84–99%, depending on type (glass bottles can be refilled around 20 times).

=== Wartime ===
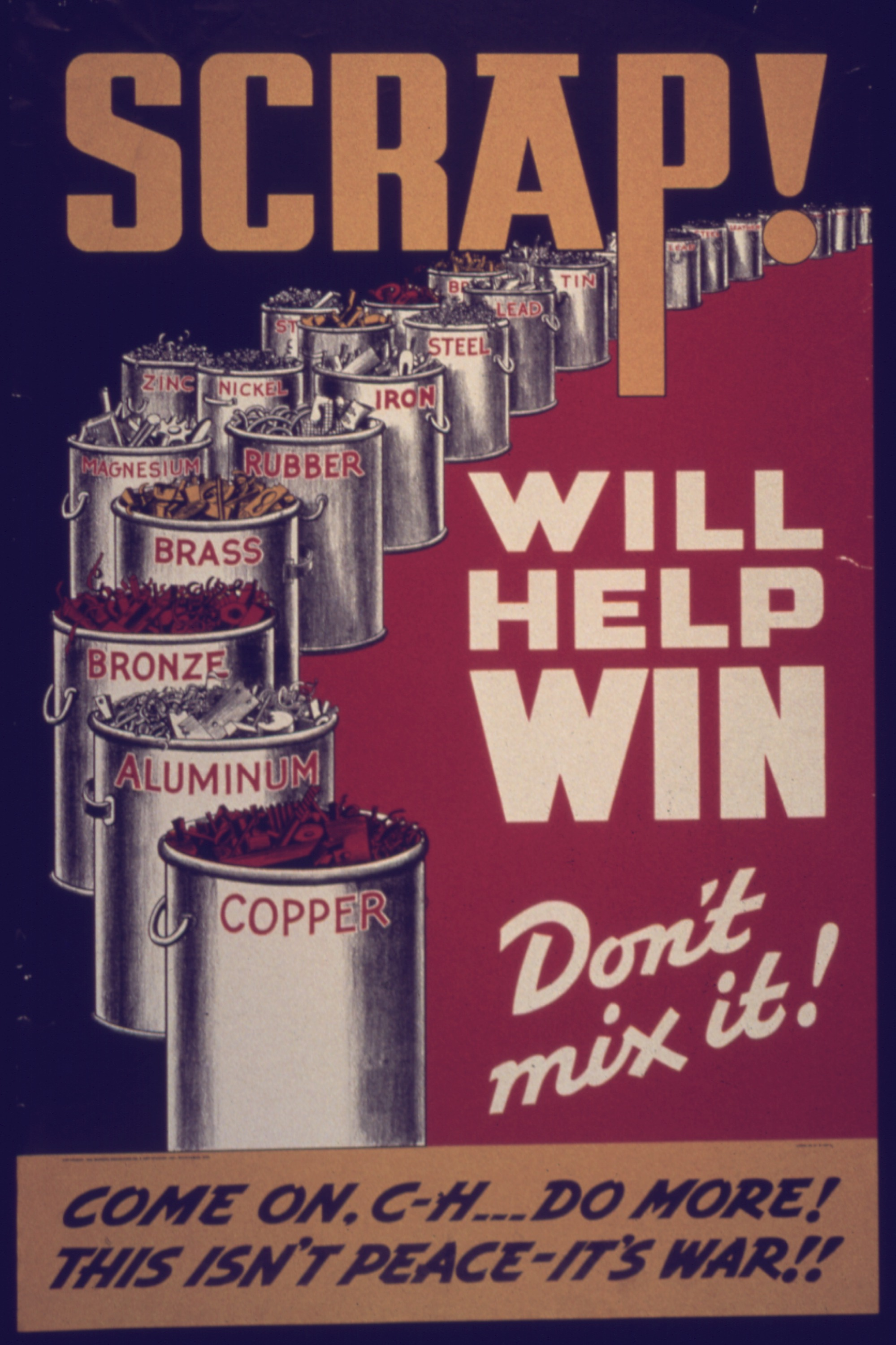
American poster from World War II

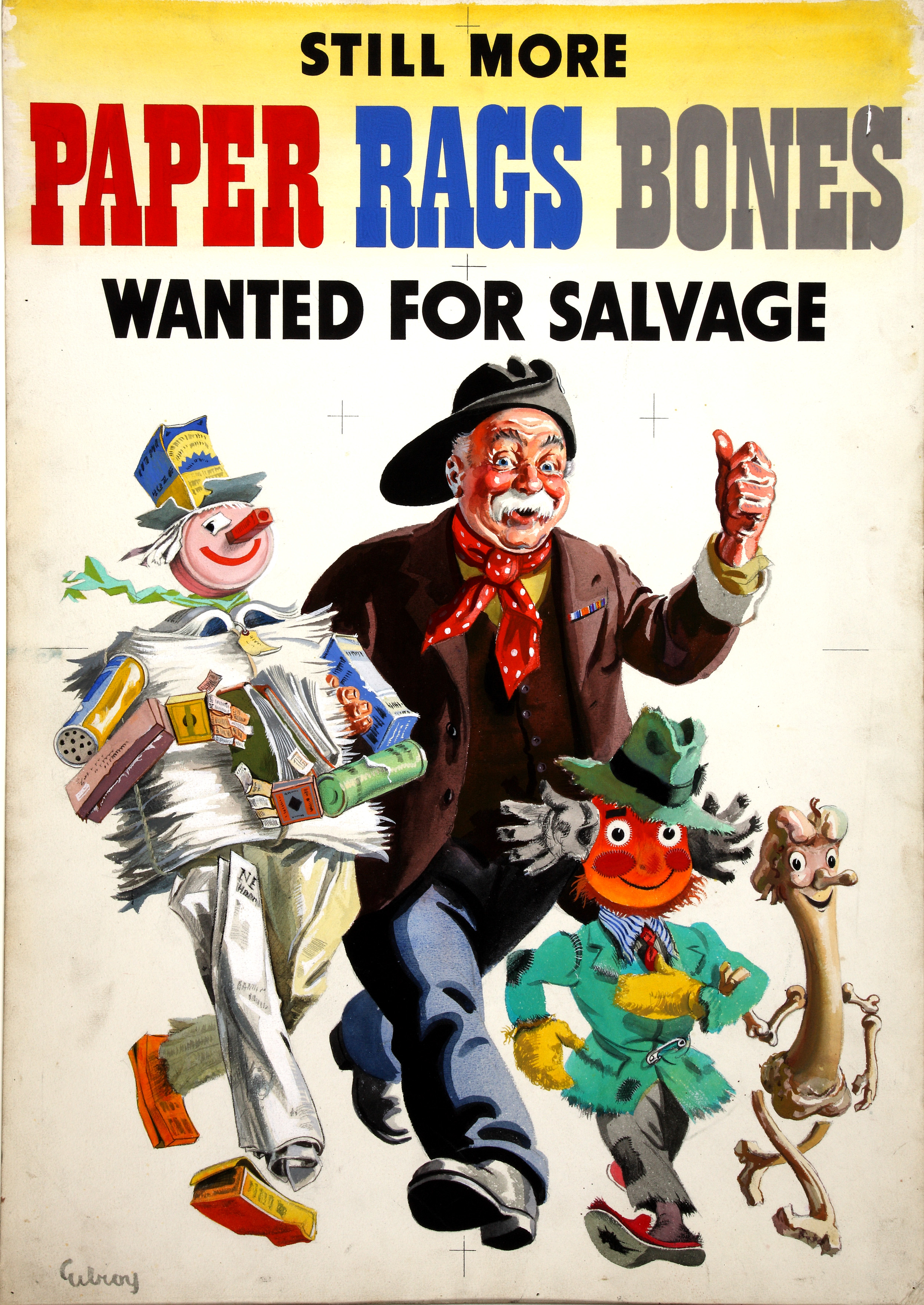
British poster from World War II

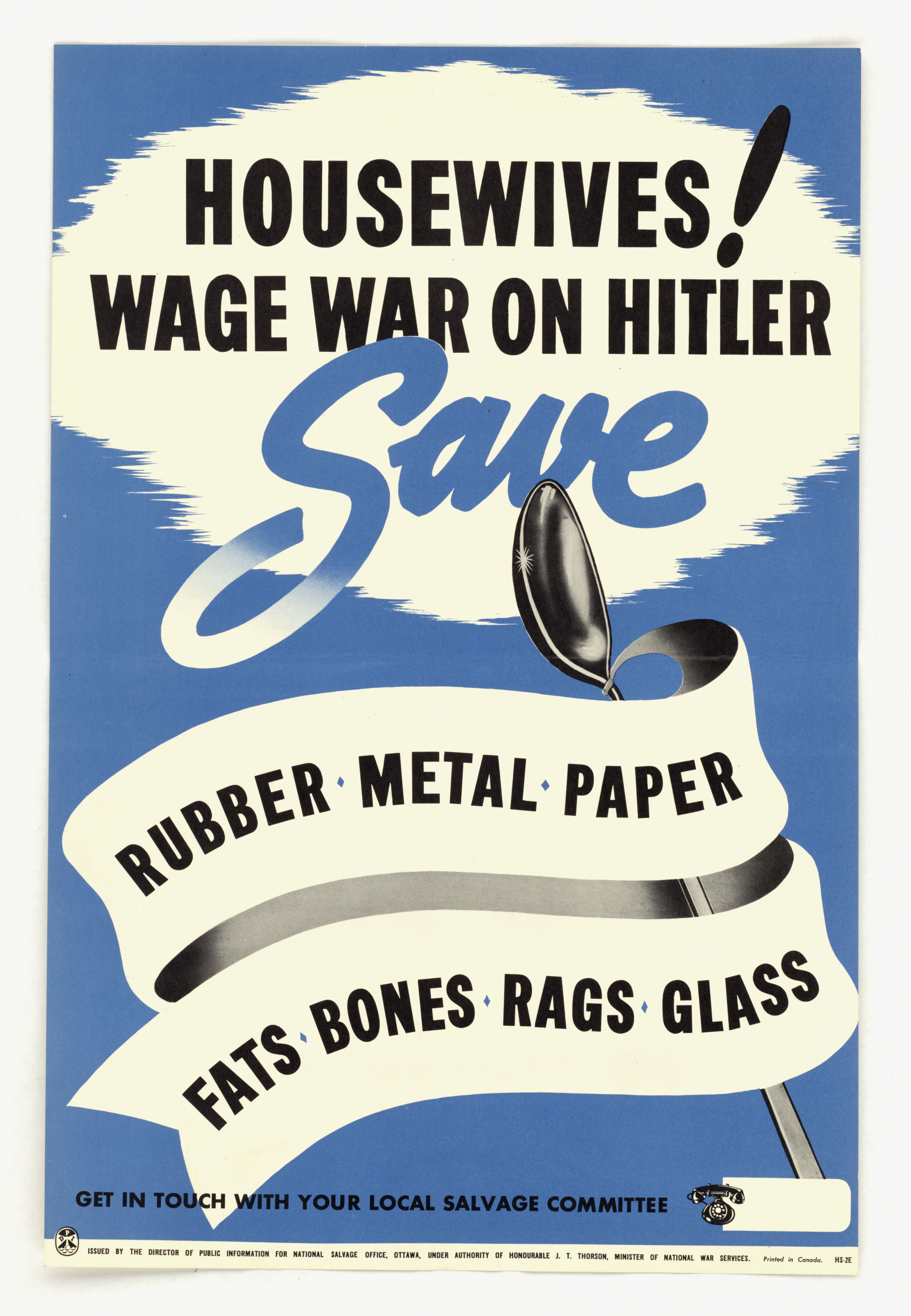
Poster from wartime Canada, encouraging housewives to "salvage"

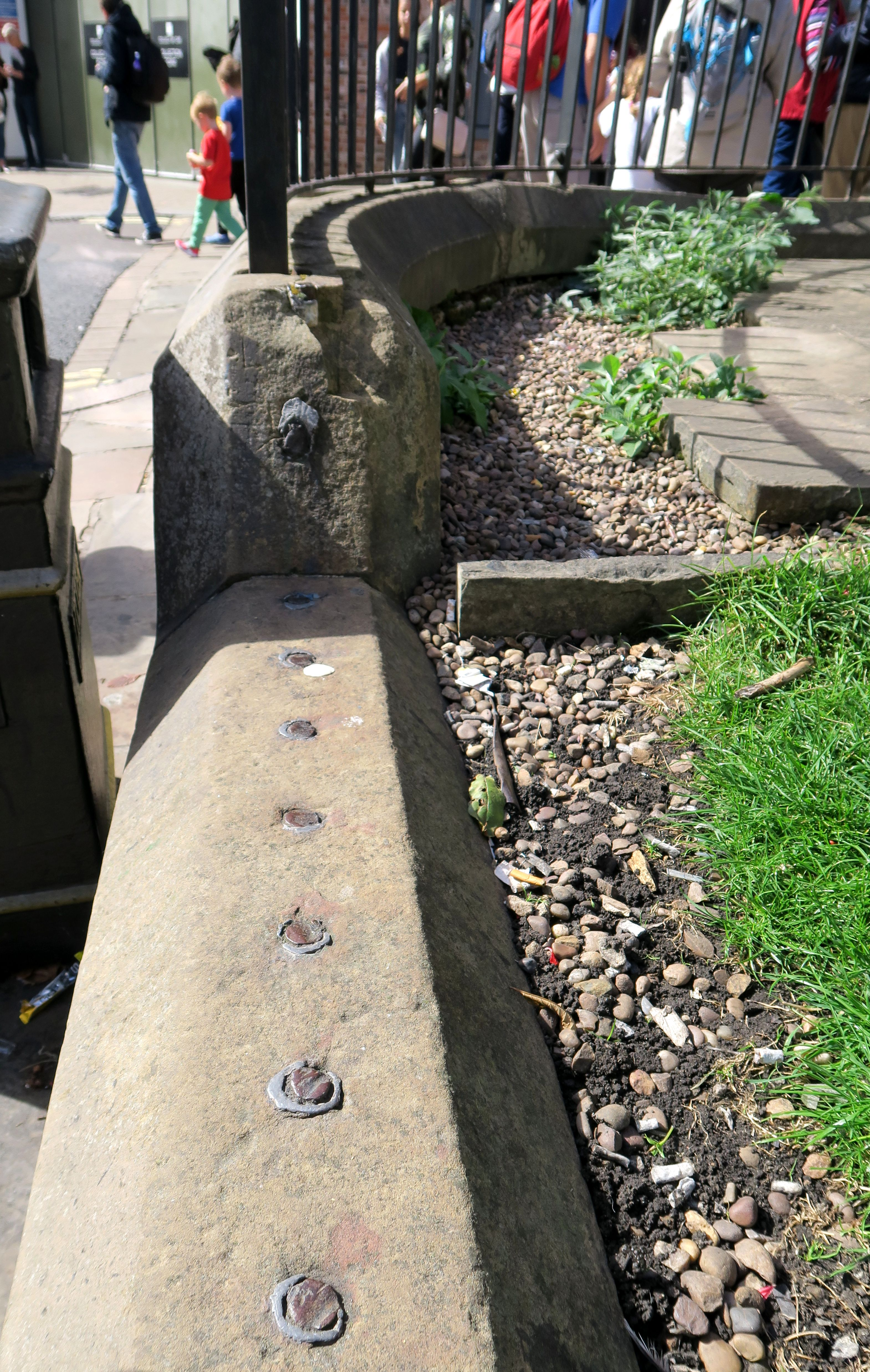
Remnants of iron fence bars in York Whip-Ma-Whop-Ma-Gate. Such public property fences were sawed for the iron and recycled during World War II.

New chemical industries created in the late 19th century both invented new materials (e.g. Bakelite in 1907) and promised to transform valueless into valuable materials. Proverbially, you could not make a silk purse of a sow's ear—until the US firm Arthur D. Little published in 1921 "On the Making of Silk Purses from Sows' Ears", its research proving that when "chemistry puts on overalls and gets down to business [...] new values appear. New and better paths are opened to reach the goals desired."

Recycling—or "salvage", as it was then usually known—was a major issue for governments during World War II, where financial constraints and significant material shortages made it necessary to reuse goods and recycle materials. These resource shortages caused by the world wars, and other such world-changing events, greatly encouraged recycling. It became necessary for most homes to recycle their waste, allowing people to make the most of what was available. Recycling household materials also meant more resources were left available for war efforts. Massive government campaigns, such as the National Salvage Campaign in Britain and the Salvage for Victory campaign in the United States, occurred in every fighting nation, urging citizens to donate metal, paper, rags, and rubber as a patriotic duty.

=== Post-World War II ===
A considerable investment in recycling occurred in the 1970s due to rising energy costs. Recycling aluminium uses only 5% of the energy of virgin production. Glass, paper and other metals have less dramatic but significant energy savings when recycled.

Although consumer electronics have been popular since the 1920s, recycling them was almost unheard of until early 1991. The first electronic waste recycling scheme was implemented in Switzerland, beginning with collection of old refrigerators, then expanding to cover all devices. When these programs were created, many countries could not deal with the sheer quantity of e-waste, or its hazardous nature, and began to export the problem to developing countries without enforced environmental legislation. (For example, recycling computer monitors in the United States costs 10 times more than in China.) Demand for electronic waste in Asia began to grow when scrapyards found they could extract valuable substances such as copper, silver, iron, silicon, nickel, and gold during the recycling process. The 2000s saw a boom in both the sales of electronic devices and their growth as a waste stream: In 2002, e-waste grew faster than any other type of waste in the EU. This spurred investment in modern automated facilities to cope with the influx, especially after strict laws were implemented in 2003.

As of 2014, the European Union had about 50% of world share of waste and recycling industries, with over 60,000 companies employing 500,000 people and a turnover of €24 billion. EU countries are mandated to reach recycling rates of at least 50%; leading countries are already at around 65%. The overall EU average was 39% in 2013 and is rising steadily, to 45% in 2015.

In 2015, the United Nations General Assembly set 17 Sustainable Development Goals. Goal 12, Responsible Consumption and Production, specifies 11 targets "to ensure sustainable consumption and production patterns". The fifth target, Target 12.5, is defined as substantially reducing waste generation by 2030, indicated by the National Recycling Rate.

In 2018, changes in the recycling industry have sparked a global "crisis". On 31 December 2017, China announced its "National Sword" policy, setting new standards for imports of recyclable material and banning materials deemed too "dirty" or "hazardous". The new policy caused drastic disruptions in the global recycling market, and reduced the prices of scrap plastic and low-grade paper. Exports of recyclable materials from G7 countries to China dropped dramatically, with many shifting to countries in southeast Asia. This generated significant concern about the recycling industry's practices and environmental sustainability. The abrupt shift caused countries to accept more materials than they could process, and raised fundamental questions about shipping waste from developed countries to countries with few environmental regulations—a practice that predated the crisis.

Recycling rates paper and cardboard

Recycling rates glass

== Health and environmental impact ==
=== Health impact ===
==== E-waste ====
According to the WHO (2023), "Every year millions of electrical and electronic devices are discarded ... a threat to the environment and to human health if they are not treated, disposed of, and recycled appropriately. Common items ... include computers ... e-waste are recycled using environmentally unsound techniques and are likely stored in homes and warehouses, dumped, exported or recycled under inferior conditions. When e-waste is treated using inferior activities, it can release as many as 1000 different chemical substances ... including harmful neurotoxicants such as lead." A paper in the journal Sustainable Materials & Technologies remarks upon the difficulty of managing e-waste, particularly from home automation products, which, due to their becoming obsolete at a high rate, are putting increasing strain on recycling systems, which have not adapted to meet the recycling needs posed by this type of product.

==== Slag recycling ====
Copper slag is obtained when copper and nickel ores are recovered from their source ores using a pyrometallurgical process, and these ores usually contain other elements which include iron, cobalt, silica, and alumina. An estimate of 2.2–3 tons of copper slag is generated per ton of copper produced, resulting in around 24.6 tons of slag per year, which is regarded as waste.

Environmental impact of slag include copper paralysis, which leads to death due to gastric hemorrhage, if ingested by humans. It may also cause acute dermatitis upon skin exposure. Toxicity may also be uptaken by crops through soil, consequently spreading animals and food sources and increasing the risk of cardiovascular diseases, cancer, cognitive impairment, chronic anemia, and damage to kidneys, bones, nervous system, brain and skin.

Substituting gravel and grit in quarries has been more cost-effective, due to having its sources with better proximity to consumer markets. Trading between countries and establishment of blast furnaces is helping increase slag utilization, hence reducing wastage and pollution.

=== Environmental impact ===
Economist Steven Landsburg, author of a paper entitled "Why I Am Not an Environmentalist", claimed that paper recycling actually reduces tree populations. He argues that because paper companies have incentives to replenish their forests, large demands for paper lead to large forests while reduced demand for paper leads to fewer "farmed" forests.

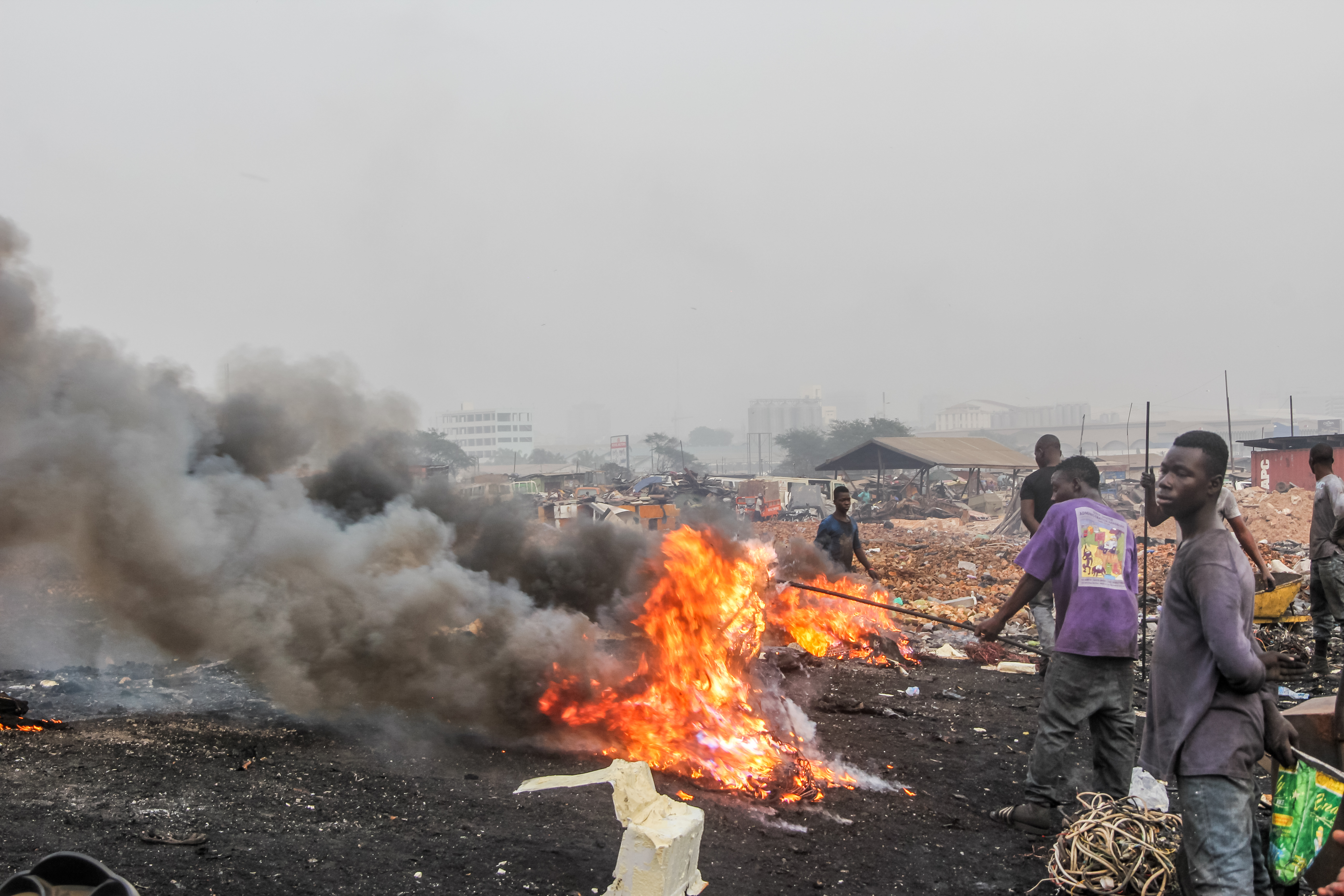
A metal scrap worker is pictured burning insulated copper wires for copper recovery at Agbogbloshie, Ghana.

When foresting companies cut down trees, more are planted in their place; however, such farmed forests are inferior to natural forests in several ways. Farmed forests are not able to fix the soil as quickly as natural forests. This can cause widespread soil erosion and often requiring large amounts of fertilizer to maintain the soil, while containing little tree and wild-life biodiversity compared to virgin forests. Also, the new trees planted are not as big as the trees that were cut down, and the argument that there would be "more trees" is not compelling to forestry advocates when they are counting saplings.

In particular, wood from tropical rainforests is rarely harvested for paper because of their heterogeneity. According to the United Nations Framework Convention on Climate Change secretariat, the overwhelming direct cause of deforestation is subsistence farming (48% of deforestation) and commercial agriculture (32%), which is linked to food, not paper production.

Other non-conventional methods of material recycling, like Waste-to-Energy (WTE) systems, have garnered increased attention in the recent past due to the polarizing nature of their emissions. While viewed as a sustainable method of capturing energy from material waste feedstocks by many, others have cited numerous explanations for why the technology has not been scaled globally.

== Legislation ==
=== Supply ===
For a recycling program to work, a large, stable supply of recyclable material is crucial. Three legislative options have been used to create such supplies: mandatory recycling collection, container deposit legislation, and refuse bans. Mandatory collection laws set recycling targets for cities, usually in the form that a certain percentage of a material must be diverted from the city's waste stream by a target date. The city is responsible for working to meet this target.

Container deposit legislation mandates refunds for the return of certain containers—typically glass, plastic and metal. When a product in such a container is purchased, a small surcharge is added that the consumer can reclaim when the container is returned to a collection point. These programs have succeeded in creating an average 80% recycling rate. Despite such good results, the shift in collection costs from local government to industry and consumers has created strong opposition in some areas—for example, where manufacturers bear the responsibility for recycling their products. In the European Union, the WEEE Directive requires producers of consumer electronics to reimburse the recyclers' costs.

An alternative way to increase the supply of recyclates is to ban the disposal of certain materials as waste, often including used oil, old batteries, tires, and garden waste. This can create a viable economy for the proper disposal of the products. Care must be taken that enough recycling services exist to meet the supply, or such bans can create increased illegal dumping.

=== Government-mandated demand ===
Four forms of legislation have also been used to increase and maintain the demand for recycled materials: minimum recycled content mandates, utilization rates, procurement policies, and recycled product labeling.

Both minimum recycled content mandates and utilization rates increase demand by forcing manufacturers to include recycling in their operations. Content mandates specify that a certain percentage of a new product must consist of recycled material. Utilization rates are a more flexible option: Industries can meet their recycling targets at any point of their operations, or even contract out recycling in exchange for tradable credits. Opponents to these methods cite their large increase in reporting requirements, and claim that they rob the industry of flexibility.

Governments have used their own purchasing power to increase recycling demand through "procurement policies". These policies are either "set-asides", which reserve a certain amount of spending for recycled products; or "price preference" programs that provide larger budgets when recycled items are purchased. Additional regulations can target specific cases: in the United States, for example, the Environmental Protection Agency mandates the purchase of oil, paper, tires and building insulation from recycled or re-refined sources whenever possible.

The final government regulation toward increased demand is recycled product labeling. When producers are required to label their packaging with the amount of recycled material it contains (including the packaging), consumers can make more educated choices. Consumers with sufficient buying power can choose more environmentally conscious options, prompting producers to increase the recycled material in their products and increase demand. Standardized recycling labeling can also have a positive effect on the supply of recyclates when it specifies how and where the product can be recycled.

== Types of recycling ==
Recycling is commonly categorized into different types based on the process used and the final output:

- Mechanical recycling: Physical processing of materials such as shredding, melting, and reforming (commonly used for plastics and metals).
- Chemical recycling: Breaking down materials into their chemical components for reuse in manufacturing.
- Closed-loop recycling: Materials are recycled into the same product without significant loss of quality.
- Open-loop recycling: Materials are recycled into different products, often with reduced quality (also known as downcycling).

Closed-loop recycling is generally regarded as more sustainable as it minimizes resource loss.

== Recyclates ==
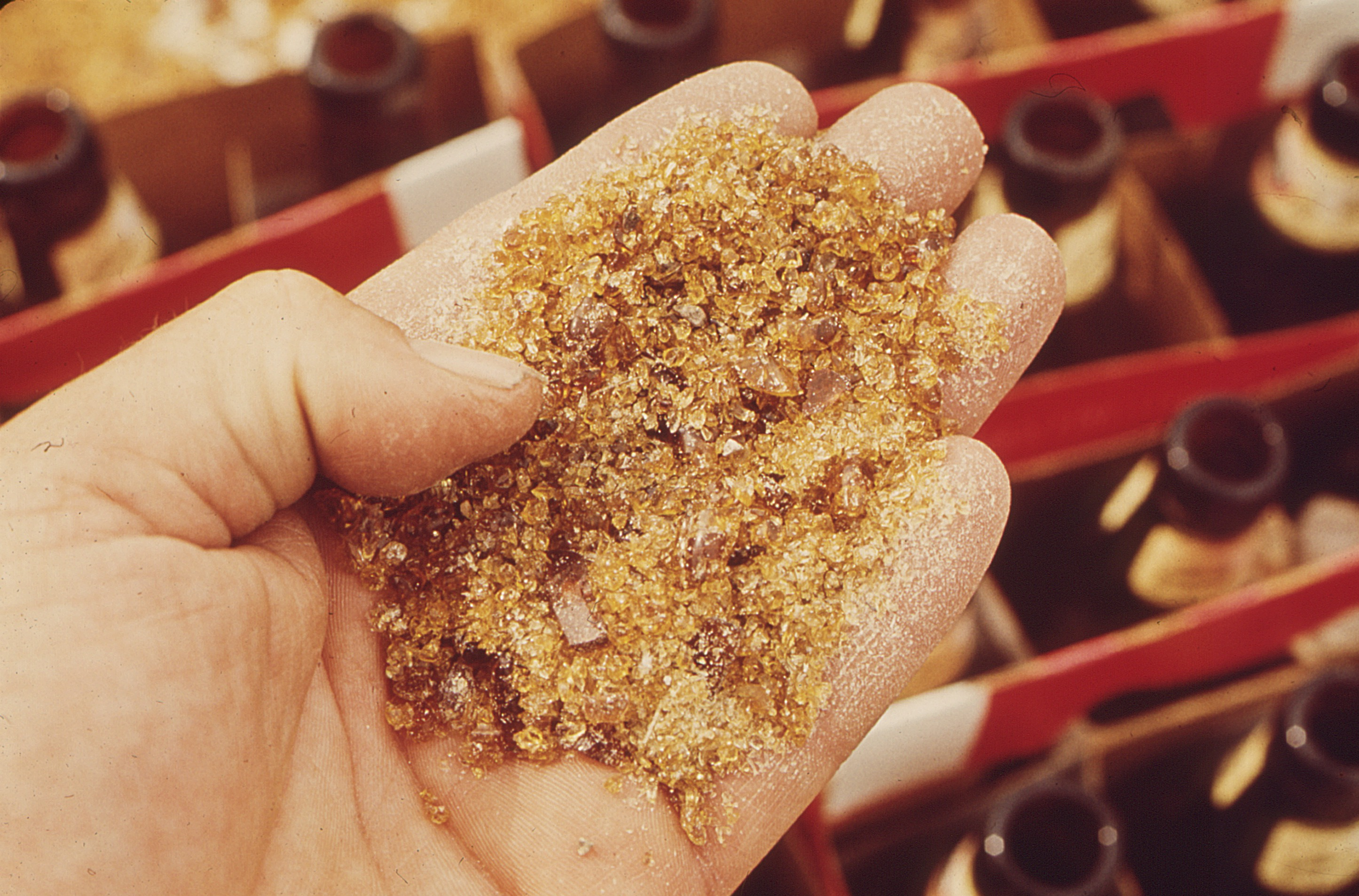
Glass recovered by crushing only one kind of beer bottle

"Recyclate" is a raw material sent to and processed in a waste recycling plant or materials-recovery facility so it can be used in the production of new materials and products. For example, plastic bottles can be made into plastic pellets and synthetic fabrics.

=== Quality of recyclate ===
The quality of recyclates is one of the principal challenges for the success of a long-term vision of a green economy and achieving zero waste. It generally refers to how much of it is composed of target material, versus non-target material and other non-recyclable material. Steel and other metals have intrinsically higher recyclate quality; it is estimated that two-thirds of all new steel comes from recycled steel. Only target material is likely to be recycled, so higher amounts of non-target and non-recyclable materials can reduce the quantity of recycled products. A high proportion of non-target and non-recyclable material can make it more difficult to achieve "high-quality" recycling; and if recyclate is of poor quality, it is more likely to end up being down-cycled or, in more extreme cases, sent to other recovery options or landfilled. For example, to facilitate the remanufacturing of clear glass products, there are tight restrictions for colored glass entering the re-melt process. Another example is the downcycling of plastic, where products such as plastic food packaging are often downcycled into lower quality products, and do not get recycled into the same plastic food packaging.

The quality of recyclate not only supports high-quality recycling, but it can also deliver significant environmental benefits by reducing, reusing, and keeping products out of landfills. High-quality recycling can support economic growth by maximizing the value of waste material. Higher income levels from the sale of quality recyclates can return value significant to local governments, households and businesses. Pursuing high-quality recycling can also promote consumer and business confidence in the waste and resource management sector, and may encourage investment in it.

There are many actions along the recycling supply chain, each of which can affect recyclate quality. Waste producers who place non-target and non-recyclable wastes in recycling collections can affect the quality of final recyclate streams, and require extra efforts to discard those materials at later stages in the recycling process. Different collection systems can induce different levels of contamination. When multiple materials are collected together, extra effort is required to sort them into separate streams and can significantly reduce the quality of the final products. Transportation and the compaction of materials can also make this more difficult. Despite improvements in technology and quality of recyclate, sorting facilities are still not 100% effective in separating materials. Storing materials outside, where they can become wet, can also cause problems for re-processors. Further sorting steps may be required to satisfactorily reduce the amount of non-target and non-recyclable material.

== Recycling consumer waste ==
=== Collection ===
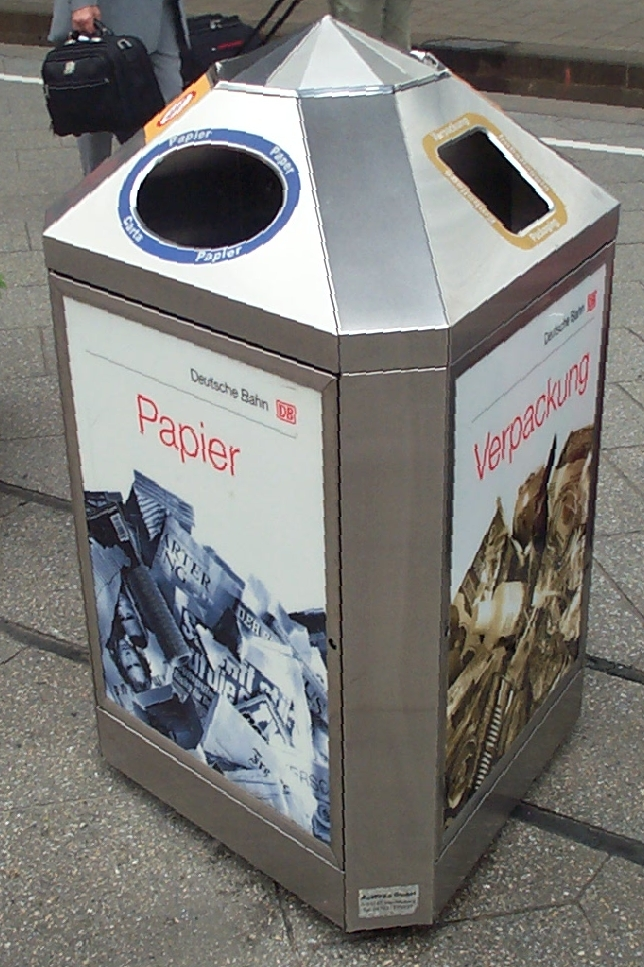
A three-sided bin at a railway station in Germany, intended to separate paper (left) and plastic wrappings (right) from other waste (back)

A number of systems have been implemented to collect recyclates from the general waste stream, occupying different places on the spectrum of trade-off between public convenience and government ease and expense. The three main categories of collection are drop-off centers, buy-back centers and curbside collection. About two-thirds of the cost of recycling is incurred in the collection phase.

==== Curbside collection ====
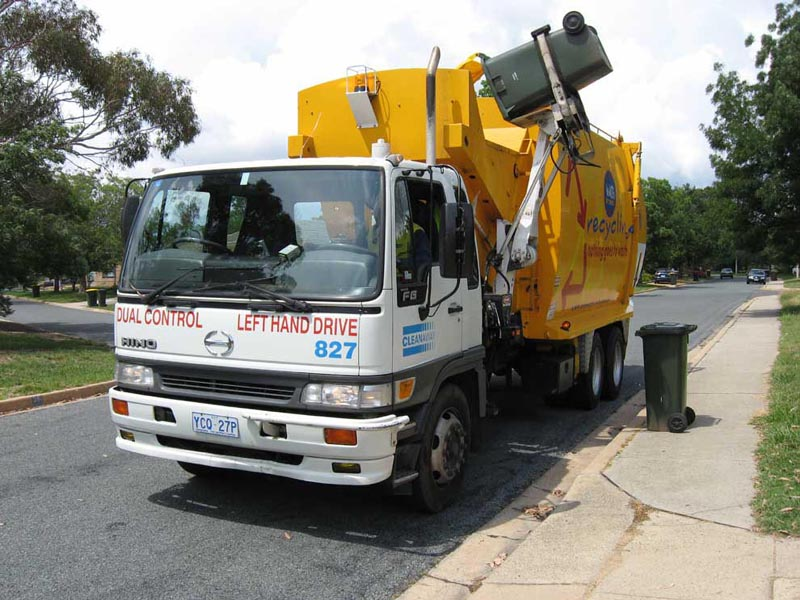
A recycling truck collecting the contents of a recycling bin in Canberra, Australia

Curbside collection encompasses many subtly different systems, which differ mostly on where in the process the recyclates are sorted and cleaned. The main categories are mixed waste collection, commingled recyclables, and source separation. A waste collection vehicle generally picks up the waste.

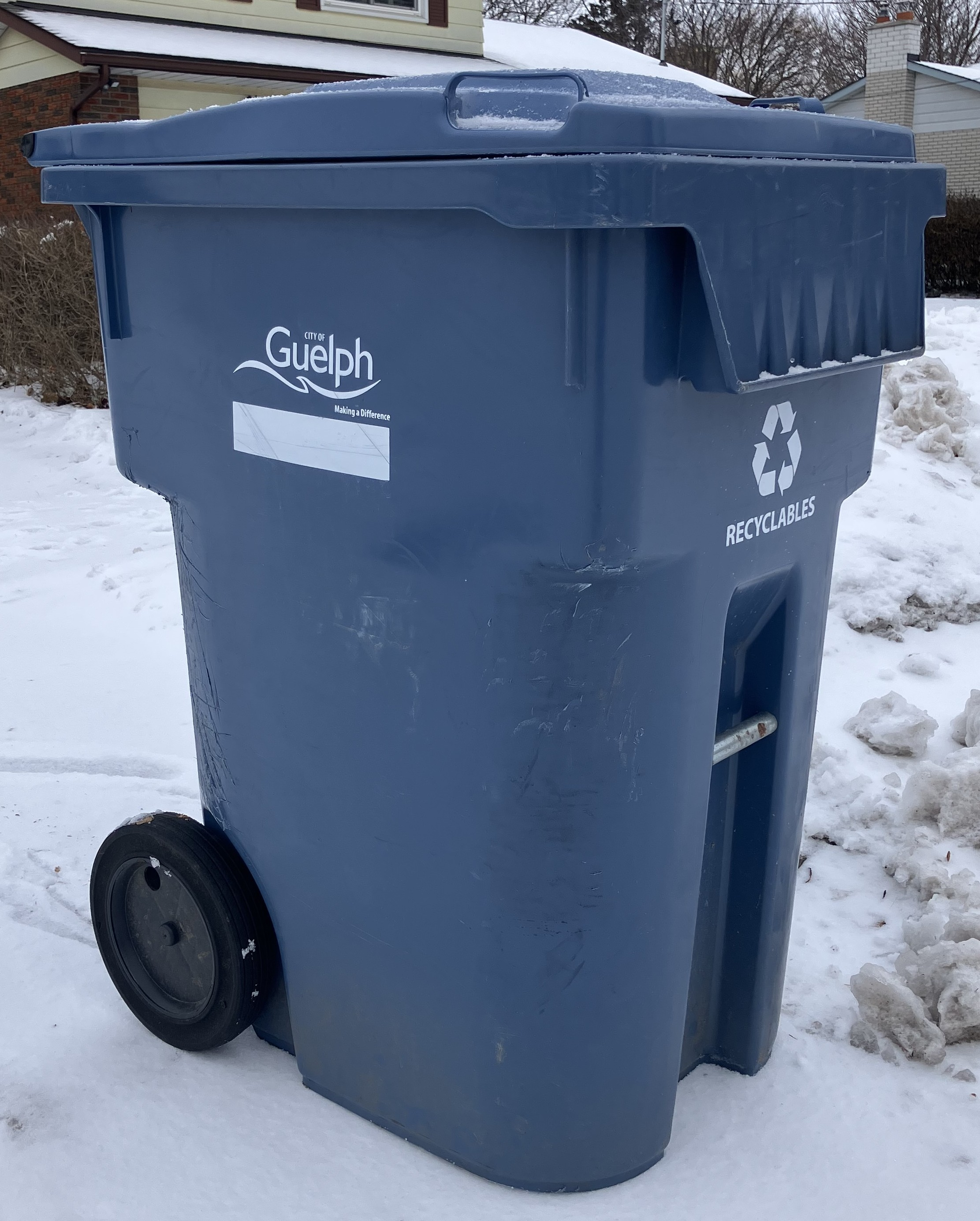
A blue recycling bin with wheels in Guelph, Canada used for residential collection.

In mixed waste collection, recyclates are collected mixed with the rest of the waste, and the desired materials are sorted out and cleaned at a central sorting facility. This results in a large amount of recyclable waste (especially paper) being too soiled to reprocess, but has advantages as well: The city need not pay for the separate collection of recyclates, no public education is needed, and any changes to the recyclability of certain materials are implemented where sorting occurs.

In a commingled or single-stream system, recyclables are mixed but kept separate from non-recyclable waste. This greatly reduces the need for post-collection cleaning, but requires public education on what materials are recyclable.

===== Source separation =====
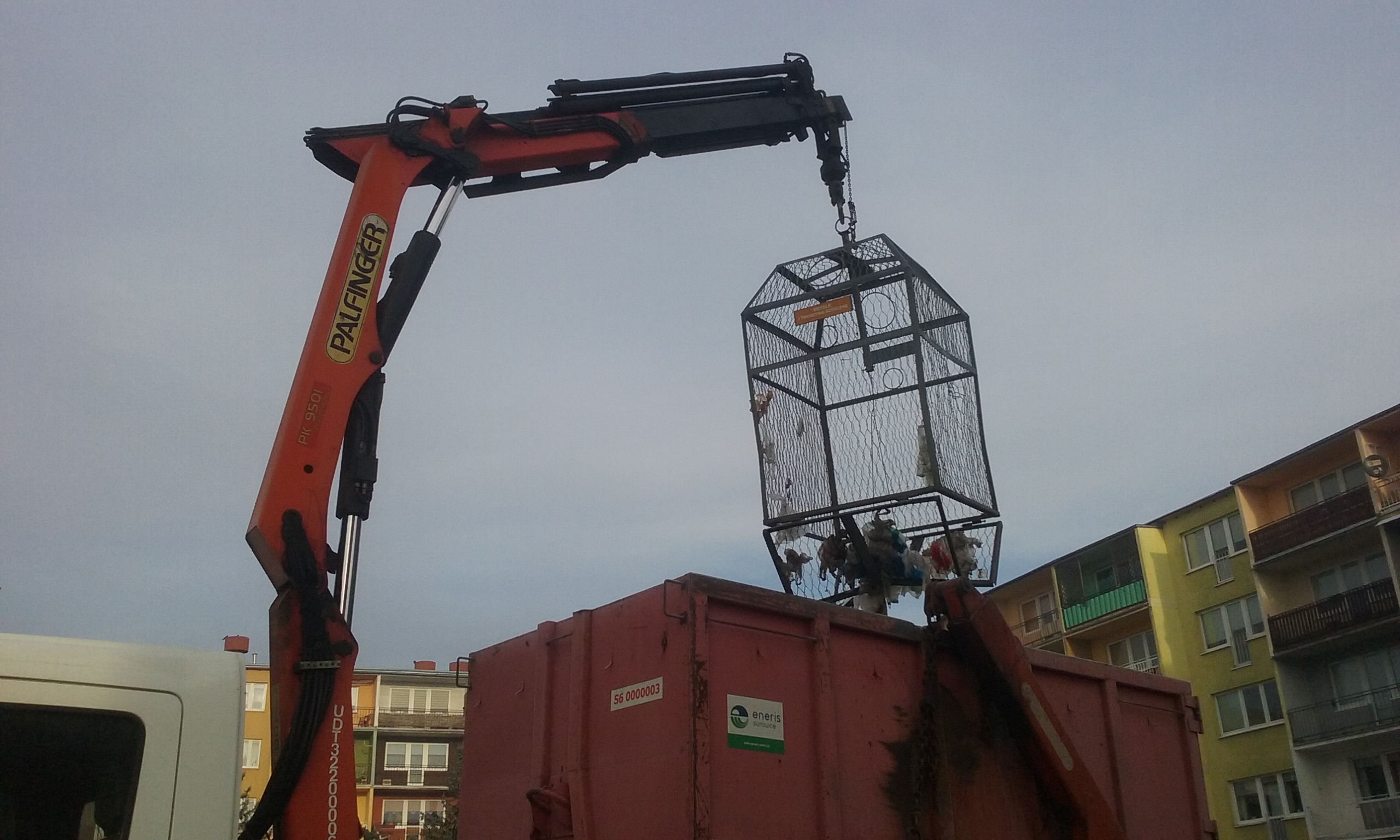
Emptying of segregated rubbish containers in Tomaszów Mazowiecki, Poland

Source separation is the other extreme, where each material is cleaned and sorted prior to collection. It requires the least post-collection sorting and produces the purest recyclates. However, it incurs additional operating costs for collecting each material, and requires extensive public education to avoid recyclate contamination. In Oregon, USA, Oregon DEQ surveyed multi-family property managers; about half of them reported problems, including contamination of recyclables due to trespassers such as transients gaining access to collection areas.

Source separation used to be the preferred method due to the high cost of sorting commingled (mixed waste) collection. However, advances in sorting technology have substantially lowered this overhead, and many areas that had developed source separation programs have switched to what is called co-mingled collection.

==== Buy-back centers ====
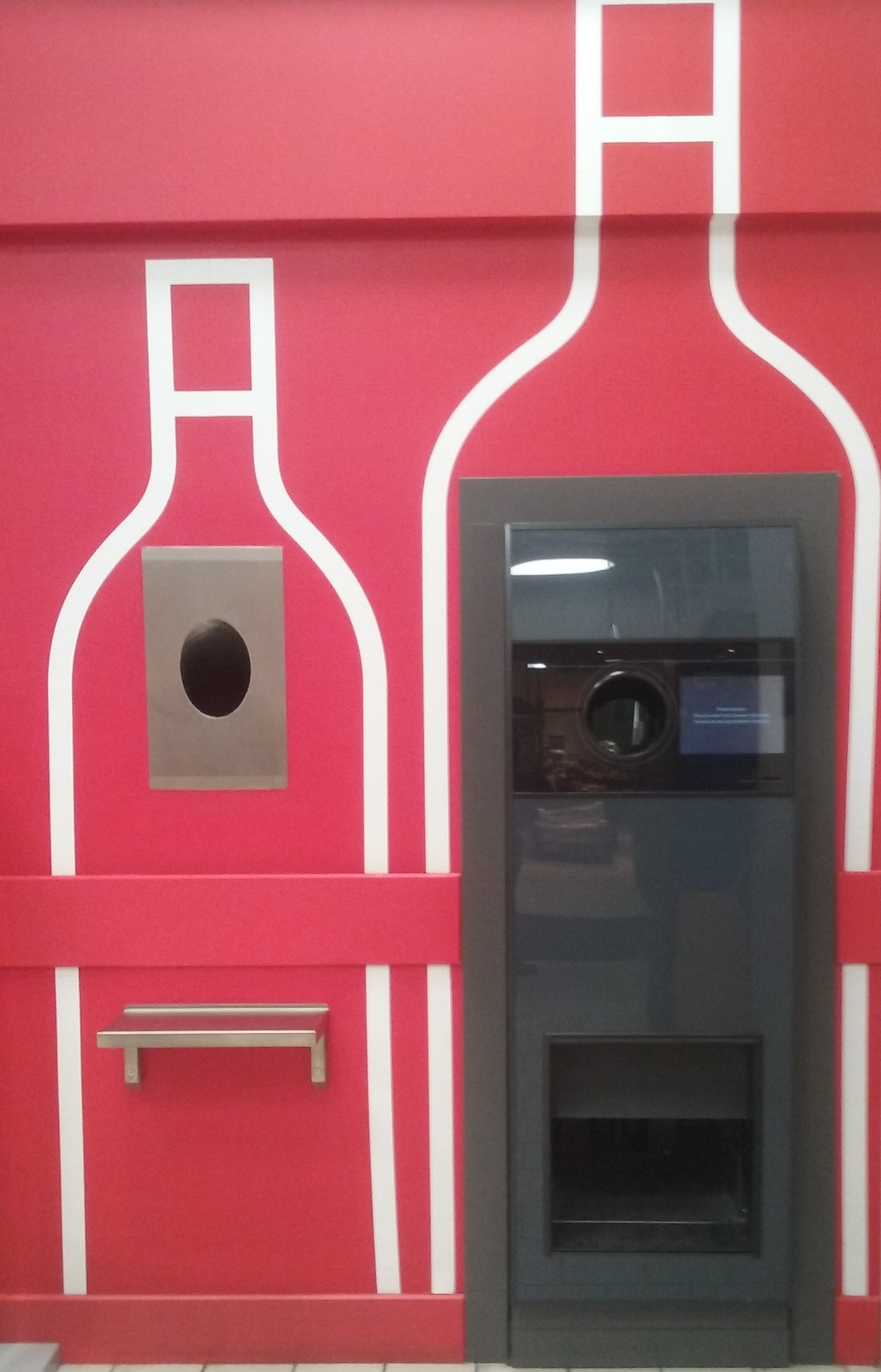
Reverse vending machine in Tomaszów Mazowiecki, Poland

At buy-back centers, separated, cleaned recyclates are purchased, providing a clear incentive for use and creating a stable supply. The post-processed material can then be sold. If profitable, this conserves the emission of greenhouse gases; if unprofitable, it increases their emission. Buy-back centres generally need government subsidies to be viable. According to a 1993 report by the U.S. National Waste & Recycling Association, it costs an average $50 to process a ton of material that can be resold for $30.

==== Drop-off centers ====
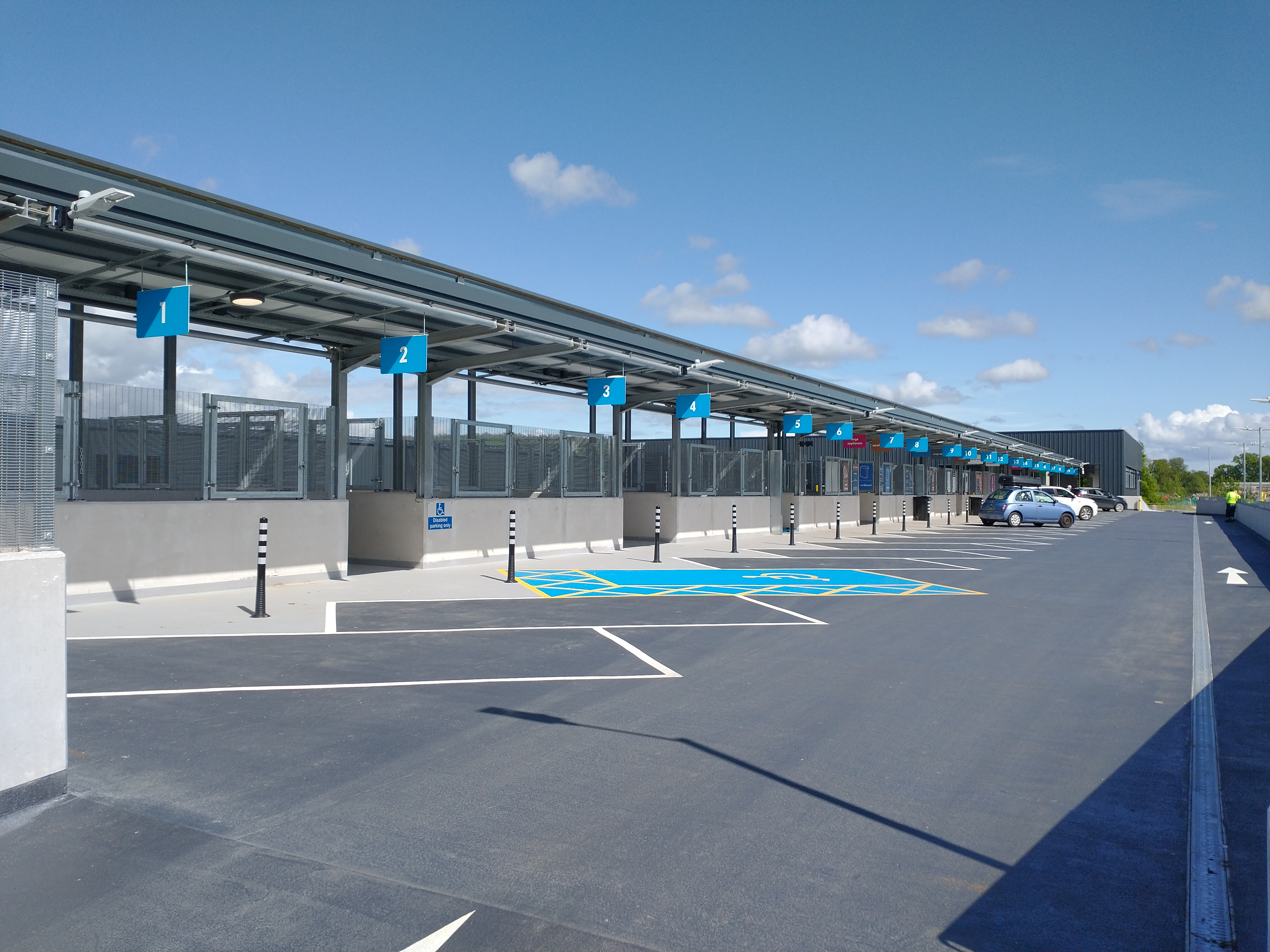
A drop-off center in the United Kingdom, where they are generally named Recycling Centres

Drop-off centers require the waste producer to carry recyclates to a central location—either an installed or mobile collection station or the reprocessing plant itself. They are the easiest type of collection to establish but suffer from low and unpredictable throughput.

==== Distributed recycling ====
For some waste materials such as plastic, recent technical devices called recyclebots enable a form of distributed recycling called DRAM (distributed recycling additive manufacturing). Preliminary life-cycle analysis (LCA) indicates that such distributed recycling of HDPE to make filament for 3D printers in rural regions consumes less energy than using virgin resin, or using conventional recycling processes with their associated transportation.

Another form of distributed recycling mixes waste plastic with sand to make bricks in Africa. Several studies have looked at the properties of recycled waste plastic and sand bricks. The composite pavers can be sold at 100% profit while employing workers at 1.5× the minimum wage in the West African region, where distributed recycling has the potential to produce 19 million pavement tiles from 28,000 tons of plastic water sachets annually in Ghana, Nigeria, and Liberia. This has also been done with COVID19 masks.

=== Sorting ===
Video of recycling sorting facility and processes

Once commingled recyclates are collected and delivered to a materials recovery facility, the materials must be sorted. This is done in a series of stages, many of which involve automated processes, enabling a truckload of material to be fully sorted in less than an hour. Some plants can now sort materials automatically; this is known as single-stream recycling. Automatic sorting may be aided by robotics and machine learning. In plants, a variety of materials is sorted including paper, different types of plastics, glass, metals, food scraps, and most types of batteries. A 30% increase in recycling rates has been seen in areas with these plants. In the US, there are over 300 materials recovery facilities.

Initially, commingled recyclates are removed from the collection vehicle and placed on a conveyor belt spread out in a single layer. Large pieces of corrugated fiberboard and plastic bags are removed by hand at this stage, as they can cause later machinery to jam.

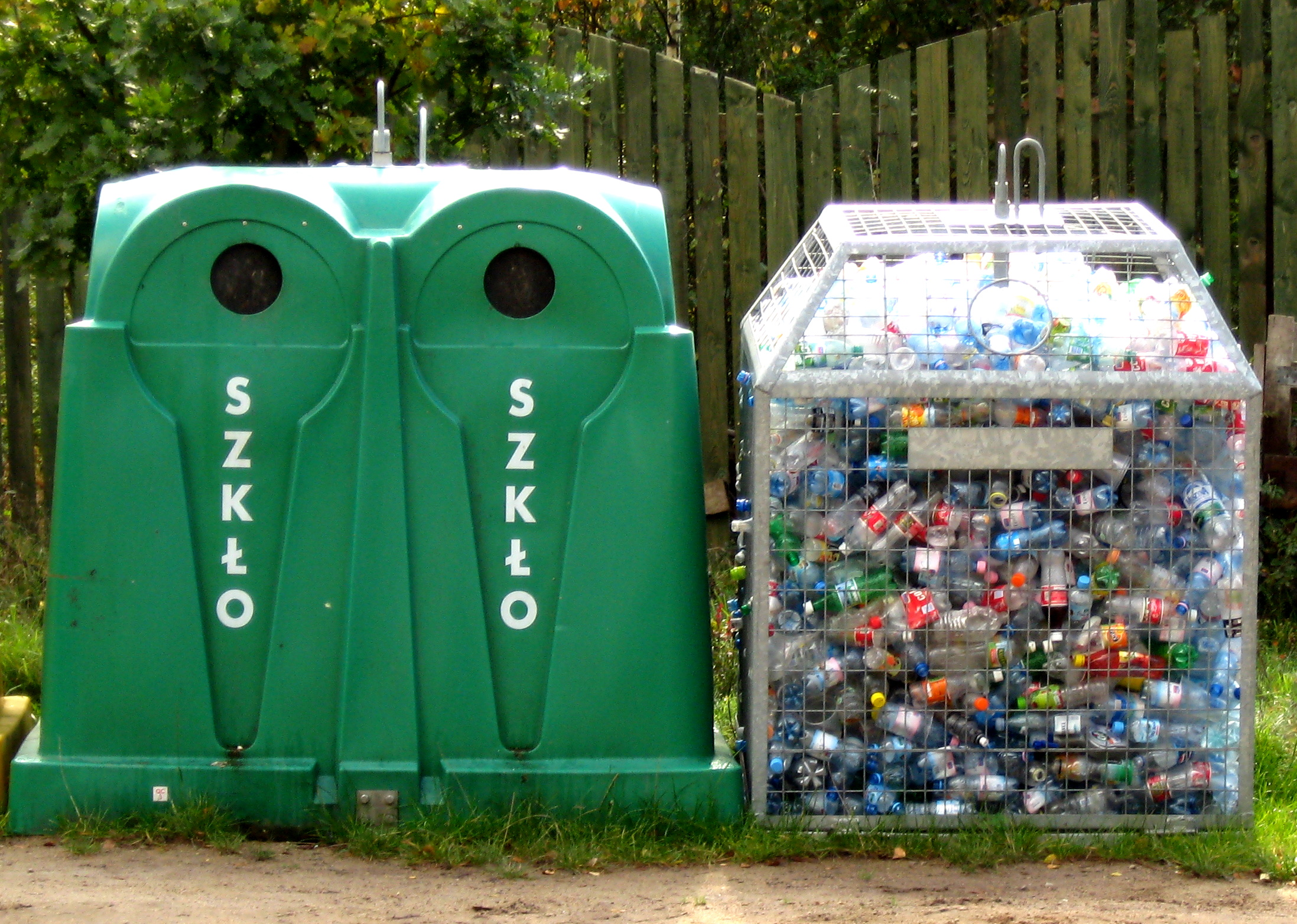
Early sorting of recyclable materials: glass and plastic bottles in Poland.

Next, automated machinery such as disk screens and air classifiers separate the recyclates by weight, splitting lighter paper and plastic from heavier glass and metal. Cardboard is removed from mixed paper, and the most common types of plastic—PET (#1) and HDPE (#2)—are collected, so these materials can be diverted into the proper collection channels. This is usually done by hand; but in some sorting centers, spectroscopic scanners are used to differentiate between types of paper and plastic based on their absorbed wavelengths. Plastics tend to be incompatible with each other due to differences in chemical composition; their polymer molecules repel each other, similar to oil and water.

Strong magnets are used to separate out ferrous metals such as iron, steel and tin cans. Non-ferrous metals are ejected by magnetic eddy currents: A rotating magnetic field induces an electric current around aluminum cans, creating an eddy current inside the cans that is repulsed by a large magnetic field, ejecting the cans from the stream.

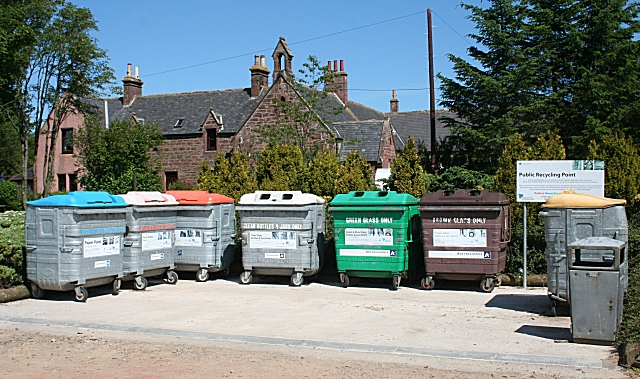
A recycling point in New Byth, Scotland, with separate containers for paper, plastics, and differently colored glass

Finally, glass is sorted according to its color: brown, amber, green, or clear. It may be sorted either by hand, or by a machine that uses colored filters to detect colors. Glass fragments smaller than 10 millimetres (0.39 in) cannot be sorted automatically, and are mixed together as "glass fines".

In 2003, San Francisco's Department of the Environment set a citywide goal of zero waste by 2020. San Francisco's refuse hauler, Recology, operates an effective recyclables sorting facility that has helped the city reach a record-breaking landfill diversion rate of 80% as of 2021. Other American cities, including Los Angeles, have achieved similar rates.

== Recycling industrial waste ==
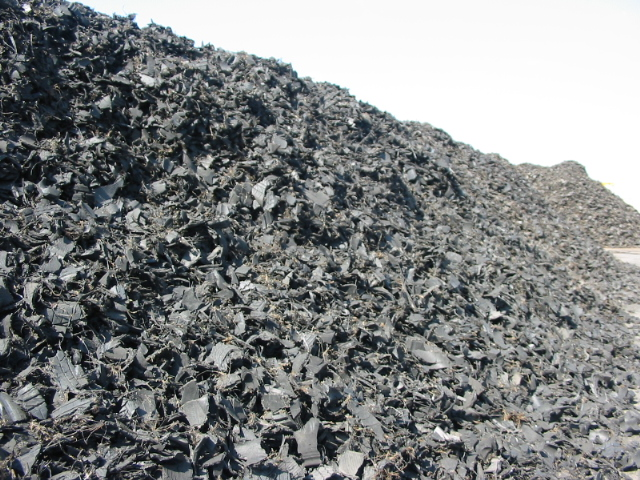
Mounds of shredded rubber tires ready for processing

Although many government programs concentrate on recycling at home, 64% of waste in the United Kingdom is generated by industry. The focus of many recycling programs in industry is their cost-effectiveness. The ubiquitous nature of cardboard packaging makes cardboard a common waste product recycled by companies that deal heavily in packaged goods, such as retail stores, warehouses, and goods distributors. Other industries deal in niche and specialized products, depending on the waste materials they handle.

Glass, lumber, wood pulp and paper manufacturers all deal directly in commonly recycled materials; however, independent tire dealers may collect and recycle rubber tires for a profit.

The waste produced from burning coal in a Coal-fired power station is often called fuel ash or fly ash in the United States. It is a very useful material and used in concrete construction. It exhibits Pozzolanic activity.

Levels of metals recycling are generally low. In 2010, the International Resource Panel, hosted by the United Nations Environment Programme (UNEP), published reports on metal stocks and their recycling rates. It reported that the increase in the use of metals during the 20th and into the 21st century has led to a substantial shift in metal stocks from below-ground to use in above-ground applications within society. For example, in the US, in-use copper grew from 73 to 238 kg per capita between 1932 and 1999.

The report's authors observed that, as metals are inherently recyclable, metal stocks in society can serve as huge above-ground mines (the term "urban mining" has thus been coined). However, they found that the recycling rates of many metals are low. They warned that the recycling rates of some rare metals used in applications such as mobile phones, battery packs for hybrid cars and fuel cells, are so low that unless future end-of-life recycling rates are dramatically increased, these critical metals will become unavailable for use in modern technology.

The military recycles some metals. The U.S. Navy's Ship Disposal Program uses ship breaking to reclaim the steel of old vessels. Ships may also be sunk to create artificial reefs. Uranium is a dense metal that has qualities superior to lead and titanium for many military and industrial uses. Uranium left over from processing it into nuclear weapons and fuel for nuclear reactors is called depleted uranium, and is used by all branches of the U.S. military for the development of such things as armor-piercing shells and shielding.

The construction industry may recycle concrete and old road surface pavement, selling these materials for profit.

Some rapidly growing industries, particularly the renewable energy and solar photovoltaic technology industries, are proactively creating recycling policies even before their waste streams have considerable volume, anticipating future demand.

Recycling of plastics is more difficult, as most programs are not able to reach the necessary level of quality. Recycling of PVC often results in downcycling of the material, which means only products of lower quality standard can be made with the recycled material.

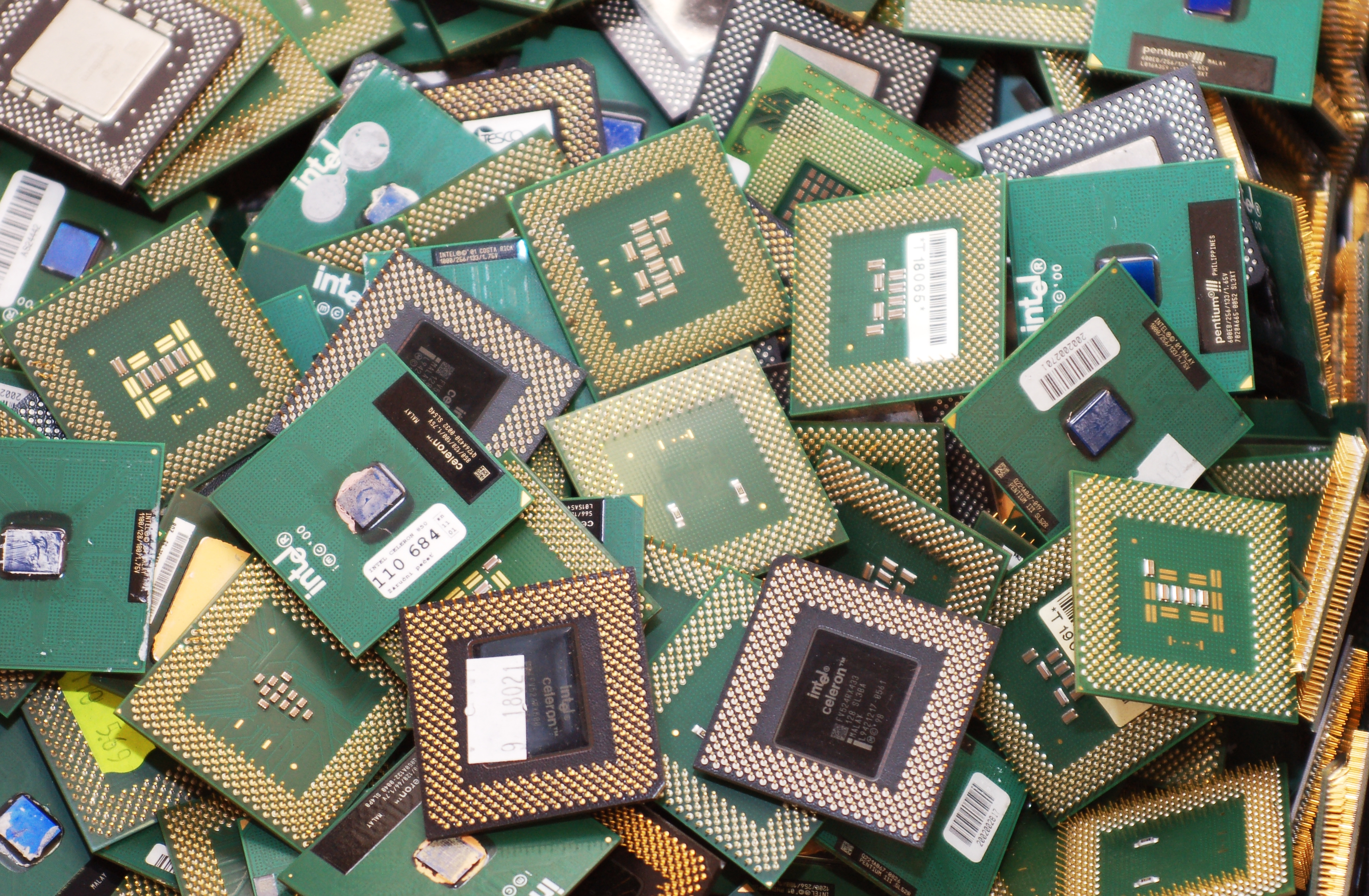
Computer processors retrieved from waste stream

E-waste is a growing problem, accounting for 20–50 million metric tons of global waste per year according to the EPA. It is also the fastest growing waste stream in the EU. Many recyclers do not recycle e-waste responsibly. After the cargo barge Khian Sea dumped 14,000 metric tons of toxic ash in Haiti, the Basel Convention was formed to stem the flow of hazardous substances into poorer countries. They created the e-Stewards certification to ensure that recyclers are held to the highest standards for environmental responsibility and to help consumers identify responsible recyclers. It operates alongside other prominent legislation, such as the Waste Electrical and Electronic Equipment Directive of the EU and the United States National Computer Recycling Act, to prevent poisonous chemicals from entering waterways and the atmosphere.

In the recycling process, television sets, monitors, cell phones, and computers are typically tested for reuse and repaired. If broken, they may be disassembled for parts still having high value if labor is cheap enough. Other e-waste is shredded to pieces roughly 10 centimetres (3.9 in) in size and manually checked to separate toxic batteries and capacitors, which contain poisonous metals. The remaining pieces are further shredded to 10 millimetres (0.39 in) particles and passed under a magnet to remove ferrous metals. An eddy current ejects non-ferrous metals, which are sorted by density either by a centrifuge or vibrating plates. Precious metals can be dissolved in acid, sorted, and smelted into ingots. The remaining glass and plastic fractions are separated by density and sold to re-processors. Television sets and monitors must be manually disassembled to remove lead from CRTs and the mercury backlight from LCDs.

Vehicles, solar panels and wind turbines can also be recycled. They often contain rare-earth elements (REE) and/or other critical raw materials. For electric car production, large amounts of REE's are typically required.

Whereas many critical raw elements and REE's can be recovered, environmental engineer Phillipe Bihouix reports that recycling of indium, gallium, germanium, selenium, and tantalum is still very difficult and their recycling rates are very low.

=== Plastic recycling ===
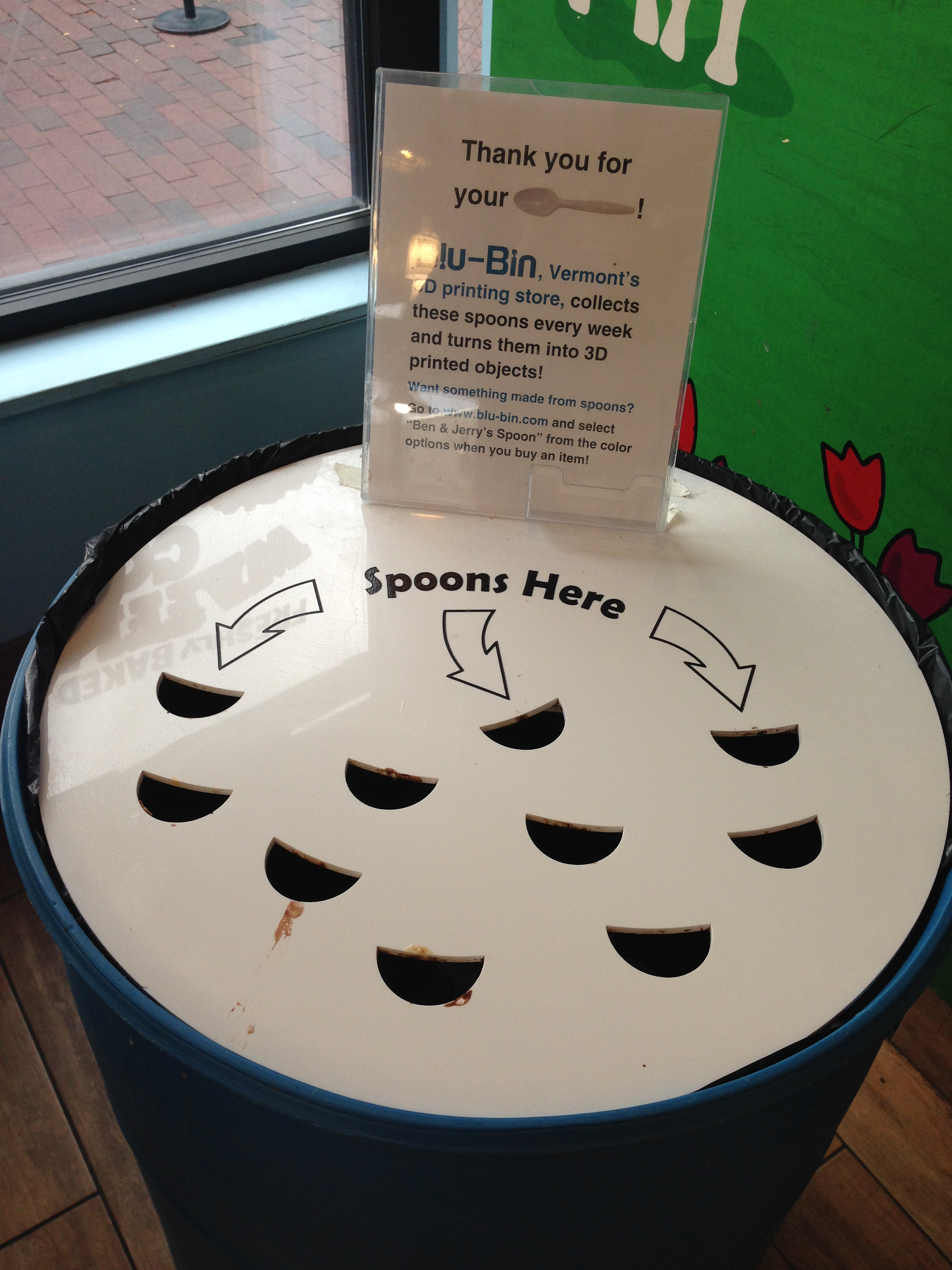
A container for recycling used plastic spoons into material for 3D printing

Plastic recycling is the process of recovering scrap or waste plastic and reprocessing the material into useful products, sometimes completely different in form from their original state. For instance, this could mean melting down soft drink bottles and then casting them as plastic chairs and tables. For some types of plastic, the same piece of plastic can only be recycled about 2–3 times before its quality decreases to the point where it can no longer be used.

==== Physical recycling ====
Some plastics are remelted to form new plastic objects; for example, PET water bottles can be converted into polyester destined for clothing. A disadvantage of this type of recycling is that the molecular weight of the polymer can change further and the levels of unwanted substances in the plastic can increase with each remelt.

A commercial-built recycling facility was sent to the International Space Station in late 2019. The facility takes in plastic waste and unneeded plastic parts and physically converts them into spools of feedstock for the space station additive manufacturing facility used for in-space 3D printing.

==== Chemical recycling ====
For some polymers, it is possible to convert them back into monomers, for example, PET can be treated with an alcohol and a catalyst to form a dialkyl terephthalate. The terephthalate diester can be used with ethylene glycol to form a new polyester polymer, thus making it possible to use the pure polymer again. In 2019, Eastman Chemical Company announced initiatives of methanolysis and syngas designed to handle a greater variety of used material.

==== Waste plastic pyrolysis to fuel oil ====
Another process involves the conversion of assorted polymers into petroleum by a much less precise thermal depolymerization process. Such a process would be able to accept almost any polymer or mix of polymers, including thermoset materials such as vulcanized rubber tires and the biopolymers in feathers and other agricultural waste. Like natural petroleum, the chemicals produced can be used as fuels or as feedstock. A RESEM Technology plant of this type in Carthage, Missouri, US, uses turkey waste as input material. Gasification is a similar process but is not technically recycling since polymers are not likely to become the result. Plastic Pyrolysis can convert petroleum based waste streams such as plastics into quality fuels, carbons. Given below is the list of suitable plastic raw materials for pyrolysis:

- Mixed plastic (HDPE, LDPE, PE, PP, Nylon, Teflon, PS, ABS, FRP, PET etc.)
- Mixed waste plastic from waste paper mill
- Multi-layered plastic

== Recycling codes ==
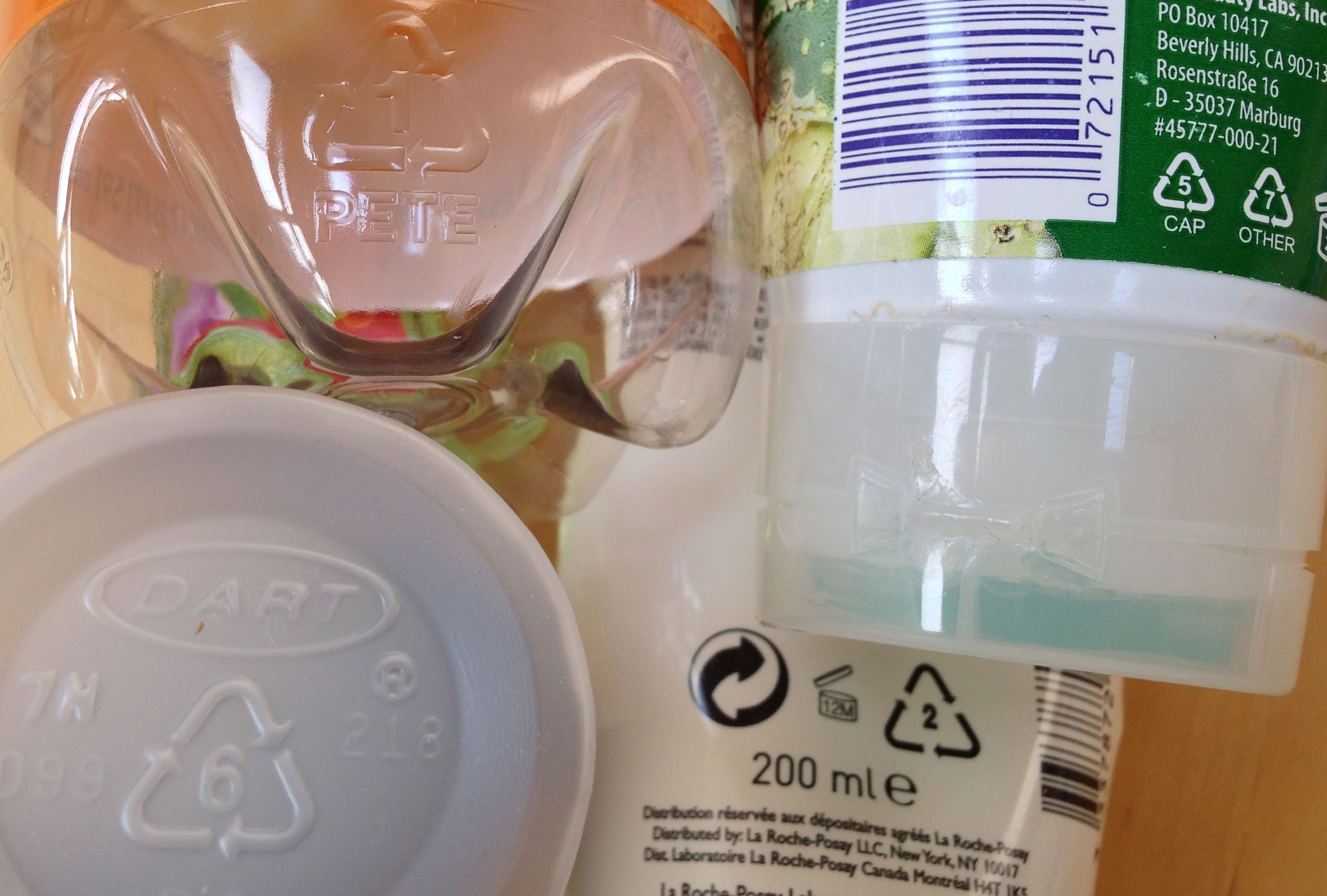
Recycling codes on products

In order to meet recyclers' needs while providing manufacturers a consistent, uniform system, a coding system was developed. The recycling code for plastics was introduced in 1988 by the plastics industry through the Society of the Plastics Industry. Because municipal recycling programs traditionally have targeted packaging—primarily bottles and containers—the resin coding system offered a means of identifying the resin content of bottles and containers commonly found in the residential waste stream.

In the United States, plastic products are printed with numbers 1–7 depending on the type of resin. Type 1 (polyethylene terephthalate) is commonly found in soft drink and water bottles. Type 2 (high-density polyethylene) is found in most hard plastics such as milk jugs, laundry detergent bottles, and some dishware. Type 3 (polyvinyl chloride) includes items such as shampoo bottles, shower curtains, hula hoops, credit cards, wire jacketing, medical equipment, siding, and piping. Type 4 (low-density polyethylene) is found in shopping bags, squeezable bottles, tote bags, clothing, furniture, and carpet. Type 5 is polypropylene and makes up syrup bottles, straws, Tupperware, and some automotive parts. Type 6 is polystyrene and makes up meat trays, egg cartons, clamshell containers, and compact disc cases. Type 7 includes all other plastics such as bulletproof materials, 3- and 5-gallon water bottles, cell phone and tablet frames, safety goggles and sunglasses. Having a recycling code or the chasing arrows logo on a material is not an automatic indicator that a material is recyclable but rather an explanation of what the material is. Types 1 and 2 are the most commonly recycled.

== Cost–benefit analysis ==
Environmental effects of recycling
Material	Energy savings vs. new production	Air pollution savings vs. new production
Aluminium	95%	95%
Cardboard	24%	—
Glass	5–30%	20%
Paper	40%	73%
Plastics	70%	—
Steel	60%	—

=== Fiscal efficiency ===
Sometimes cities have found recycling saves resources compared to other methods of disposal of waste. Two years after New York City declared that implementing recycling programs would be "a drain on the city", New York City leaders realized that an efficient recycling system could save the city over $20 million. Municipalities often see fiscal benefits from implementing recycling programs, largely due to the reduced landfill costs. A study conducted by the Technical University of Denmark according to the Economist found that in 83 percent of cases, recycling is the most efficient method to dispose of household waste. However, a 2004 assessment by the Danish Environmental Assessment Institute concluded that incineration was the most effective method for disposing of drink containers, even aluminium ones.

Fiscal efficiency is separate from economic efficiency. Economic analysis of recycling does not include what economists call externalities: unpriced costs and benefits that accrue to individuals outside of private transactions. Examples include less air pollution and greenhouse gases from incineration and less waste leaching from landfills. Without mechanisms such as taxes or subsidies, businesses and consumers following their private benefit would ignore externalities despite the costs imposed on society. If landfills and incinerator pollution is inadequately regulated, these methods of waste disposal appear cheaper than they really are, because part of their cost is the pollution imposed on people nearby. Thus, advocates have pushed for legislation to increase demand for recycled materials. The United States Environmental Protection Agency (EPA) has concluded in favor of recycling, saying that recycling efforts reduced the country's carbon emissions by a net 49 million metric tonnes in 2005. In the United Kingdom, the Waste and Resources Action Programme stated that Great Britain's recycling efforts reduce CO_{2} emissions by 10–15 million tonnes a year. The question for economic efficiency is whether this reduction is worth the extra cost of recycling and thus makes the artificial demand creates by legislation worthwhile.

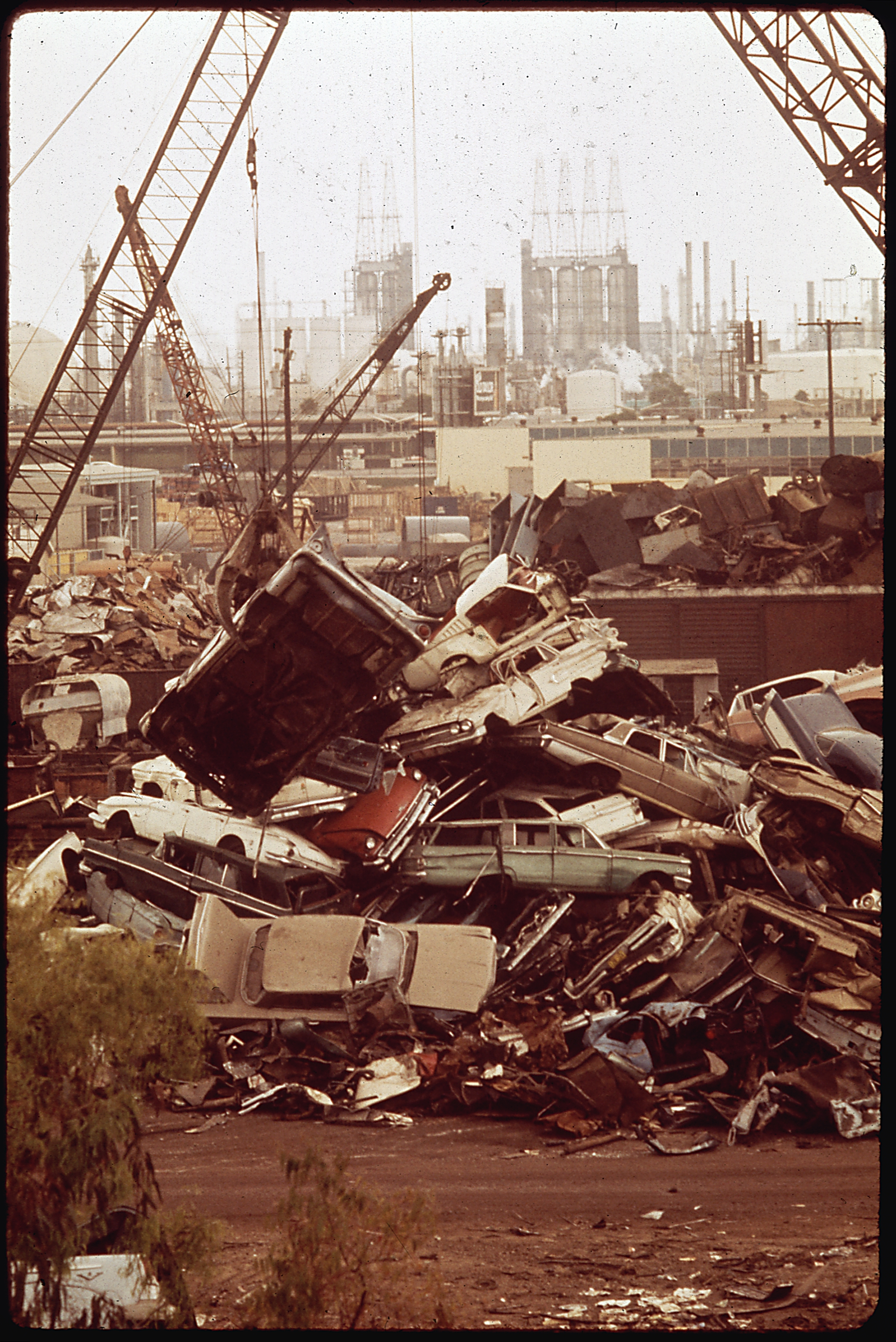
Wrecked automobiles gathered for smelting

Certain requirements must be met for recycling to be economically feasible and environmentally effective. These include an adequate source of recyclates, a system to extract those recyclates from the waste stream, a nearby factory capable of reprocessing the recyclates, and a potential demand for the recycled products. These last two requirements are often overlooked—without both an industrial market for production using the collected materials and a consumer market for the manufactured goods, recycling is incomplete and in fact only "collection".

Free-market economist Julian Simon remarked "There are three ways society can organize waste disposal: (a) commanding, (b) guiding by tax and subsidy, and (c) leaving it to the individual and the market". These principles appear to divide economic thinkers today.

Frank Ackerman favours a high level of government intervention to provide recycling services. He believes that recycling's benefit cannot be effectively quantified by traditional laissez-faire economics. Allen Hershkowitz supports intervention, saying that it is a public service equal to education and policing. He argues that manufacturers should shoulder more of the burden of waste disposal.

Paul Calcott and Margaret Walls advocate the second option. A deposit refund scheme and a small refuse charge would encourage recycling but not at the expense of illegal dumping. Thomas C. Kinnaman concludes that a landfill tax would force consumers, companies and councils to recycle more.

Most free-market thinkers detest subsidy and intervention, arguing that they waste resources. The general argument is that if cities charge the full cost of garbage collection, private companies can profitably recycle any materials for which the benefit of recycling exceeds the cost (e.g. aluminum) and do not recycle other materials for which the benefit is less than the cost (e.g. glass). Cities, on the other hand, often recycle even when they not only do not receive enough for the paper or plastic to pay for its collection, but must actually pay private recycling companies to take it off of their hands. Terry Anderson and Donald Leal think that all recycling programmes should be privately operated, and therefore would only operate if the money saved by recycling exceeds its costs. Daniel K. Benjamin argues that it wastes people's resources and lowers the wealth of a population. He notes that recycling can cost a city more than twice as much as landfills, that in the United States landfills are so heavily regulated that their pollution effects are negligible, and that the recycling process also generates pollution and uses energy, which may or may not be less than from virgin production.

=== Trade in recyclates ===
Certain countries trade in unprocessed recyclates. Some have complained that the ultimate fate of recyclates sold to another country is unknown and they may end up in landfills instead of being reprocessed. According to one report, in America, 50–80 percent of computers destined for recycling are actually not recycled. There are reports of illegal-waste imports to China being dismantled and recycled solely for monetary gain, without consideration for workers' health or environmental damage. Although the Chinese government has banned these practices, it has not been able to eradicate them. In 2008, the prices of recyclable waste plummeted before rebounding in 2009. Cardboard averaged about £53/tonne from 2004 to 2008, dropped to £19/tonne, and then went up to £59/tonne in May 2009. PET plastic averaged about £156/tonne, dropped to £75/tonne and then moved up to £195/tonne in May 2009.

Certain regions have difficulty using or exporting as much of a material as they recycle. This problem is most prevalent with glass: both Britain and the U.S. import large quantities of wine bottled in green glass. Though much of this glass is sent to be recycled, outside the American Midwest there is not enough wine production to use all of the reprocessed material. The extra must be downcycled into building materials or re-inserted into the regular waste stream.

Similarly, the northwestern United States has difficulty finding markets for recycled newspaper, given the large number of pulp mills in the region as well as the proximity to Asian markets. In other areas of the U.S., however, demand for used newsprint has seen wide fluctuation.

In some U.S. states, a program called RecycleBank pays people to recycle, receiving money from local municipalities for the reduction in landfill space that must be purchased. It uses a single stream process in which all material is automatically sorted.

== Criticisms and responses ==
Much of the difficulty inherent in recycling comes from the fact that most products are not designed with recycling in mind. In the USA around 6 to 7 percent of plastic is recycled. The concept of sustainable design aims to solve this problem, and was laid out in the 2002 book Cradle to Cradle: Remaking the Way We Make Things by architect William McDonough and chemist Michael Braungart. They suggest that every product (and all packaging it requires) should have a complete "closed-loop" cycle mapped out for each component—a way in which every component either returns to the natural ecosystem through biodegradation or is recycled indefinitely.

Complete recycling is impossible from a practical standpoint. In summary, substitution and recycling strategies only delay the depletion of non-renewable stocks and therefore may buy time in the transition to true or strong sustainability, which ultimately is only guaranteed in an economy based on renewable resources.

— M. H. Huesemann, 2003

While recycling diverts waste from entering directly into landfill sites, current recycling misses the dispersive components. Critics believe that complete recycling is impracticable as highly dispersed wastes become so diluted that the energy needed for their recovery becomes increasingly excessive.

As with environmental economics, care must be taken to ensure a complete view of the costs and benefits involved. For example, paperboard packaging for food products is more easily recycled than most plastic, but is heavier to ship and may result in more waste from spoilage. Economic expenses can incentivize fraud.

=== Net environmental benefits ===
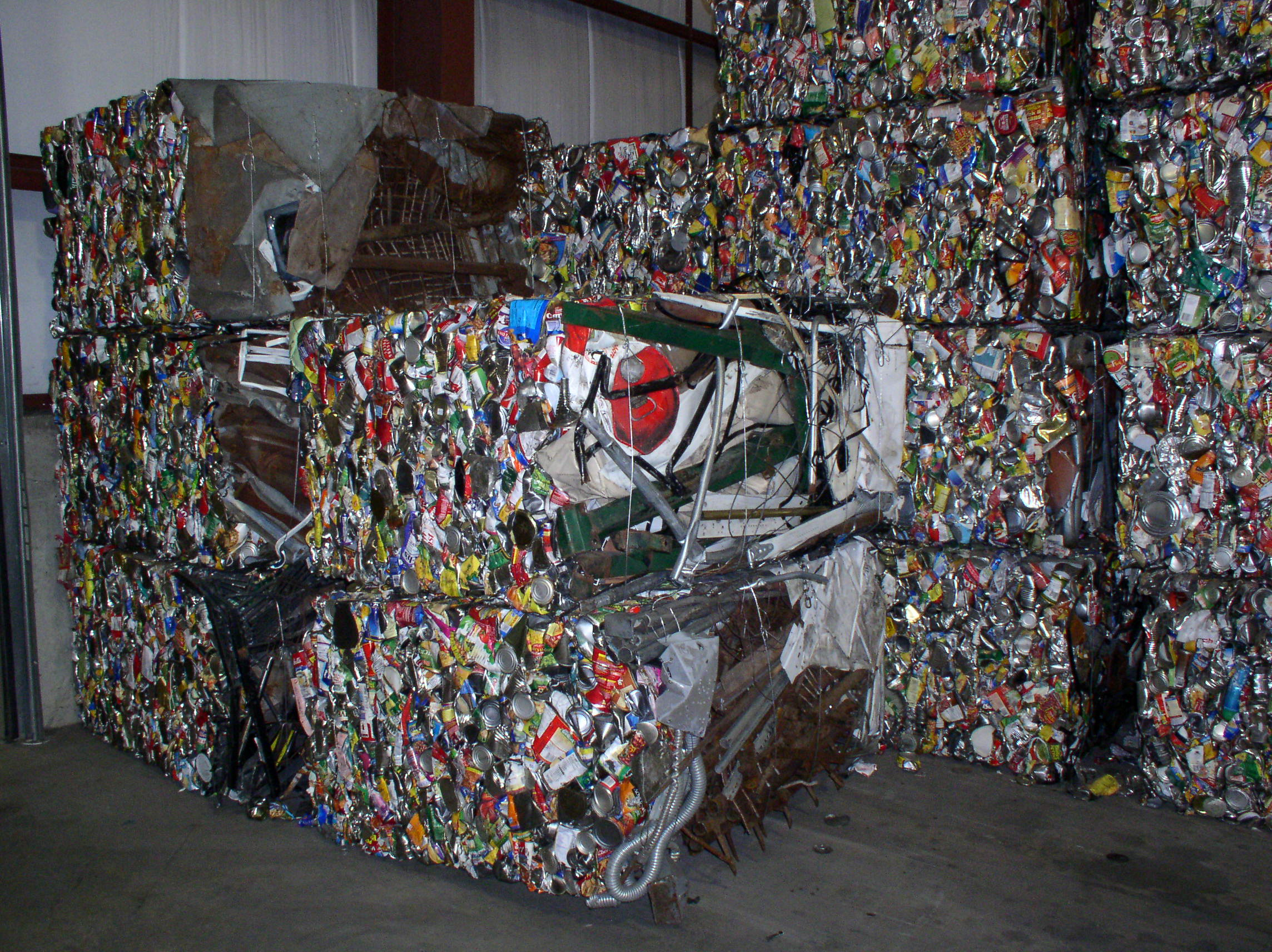
Bales of crushed steel ready for transport to the smelter

Critics dispute the net economic and environmental benefits of recycling over its costs, and suggest that proponents of recycling often make matters worse and suffer from confirmation bias. Specifically, critics argue that the costs and energy used in collection and transportation detract from (and outweigh) the costs and energy saved in the production process; also that the jobs produced by the recycling industry can be a poor trade for the jobs lost in logging, mining, and other industries associated with production; and that materials such as paper pulp can only be recycled a few times before material degradation prevents further recycling.

The amount of energy saved through recycling depends upon the material being recycled and the type of energy accounting that is used. Correct accounting for this saved energy can be accomplished with life-cycle analysis using real energy values, and in addition, exergy, which is a measure of how much useful energy can be used. In general, it takes far less energy to produce a unit mass of recycled materials than it does to make the same mass of virgin materials.

Some scholars use emergy (spelled with an m) analysis, for example, budgets for the amount of energy of one kind (exergy) that is required to make or transform things into another kind of product or service. Emergy calculations take into account economics that can alter pure physics-based results. Using emergy life-cycle analysis researchers have concluded that materials with large refining costs have the greatest potential for high recycle benefits. Moreover, the highest emergy efficiency accrues from systems geared toward material recycling, where materials are engineered to recycle back into their original form and purpose, followed by adaptive reuse systems where the materials are recycled into a different kind of product, and then by-product reuse systems where parts of the products are used to make an entirely different product.

The Energy Information Administration (EIA) states on its website that "a paper mill uses 40 percent less energy to make paper from recycled paper than it does to make paper from fresh lumber." Some critics argue that it takes more energy to produce recycled products than it does to dispose of them in traditional landfill methods, since the curbside collection of recyclables often requires a second waste truck. However, recycling proponents point out that a second timber or logging truck is eliminated when paper is collected for recycling, so the net energy consumption is the same. An emergy life-cycle analysis on recycling revealed that fly ash, aluminum, recycled concrete aggregate, recycled plastic, and steel yield higher efficiency ratios, whereas the recycling of lumber generates the lowest recycle benefit ratio. Hence, the specific nature of the recycling process, the methods used to analyse the process, and the products involved affect the energy savings budgets.

It is difficult to determine the amount of energy consumed or produced in waste disposal processes in broader ecological terms, where causal relations dissipate into complex networks of material and energy flow.

[C]ities do not follow all the strategies of ecosystem development. Biogeochemical paths become fairly straight relative to wild ecosystems, with reduced recycling, resulting in large flows of waste and low total energy efficiencies. By contrast, in wild ecosystems, one population's wastes are another population's resources, and succession results in efficient exploitation of available resources. However, even modernized cities may still be in the earliest stages of a succession that may take centuries or millennia to complete.

How much energy is used in recycling also depends on the type of material being recycled and the process used to do so. Aluminium is generally agreed to use far less energy when recycled rather than being produced from scratch. The EPA states that "recycling aluminum cans, for example, saves 95 percent of the energy required to make the same amount of aluminum from its virgin source, bauxite." In 2009, more than half of all aluminium cans produced came from recycled aluminium. Similarly, it has been estimated that new steel produced with recycled cans reduces greenhouse gas emissions by 75%.

Every year, millions of tons of materials are being exploited from the earth's crust, and processed into consumer and capital goods. After decades to centuries, most of these materials are "lost". With the exception of some pieces of art or religious relics, they are no longer engaged in the consumption process. Where are they? Recycling is only an intermediate solution for such materials, although it does prolong the residence time in the anthroposphere. For thermodynamic reasons, however, recycling cannot prevent the final need for an ultimate sink.

— P. H. Brunner

Economist Steven Landsburg has suggested that the sole benefit of reducing landfill space is trumped by the energy needed and resulting pollution from the recycling process. Others, however, have calculated through life-cycle assessment that producing recycled paper uses less energy and water than harvesting, pulping, processing, and transporting virgin trees. When less recycled paper is used, additional energy is needed to create and maintain farmed forests until these forests are as self-sustainable as virgin forests.

Other studies have shown that recycling in itself is inefficient to perform the "decoupling" of economic development from the depletion of non-renewable raw materials that is necessary for sustainable development. The international transportation or recycle material flows through "... different trade networks of the three countries result in different flows, decay rates, and potential recycling returns". As global consumption of a natural resources grows, their depletion is inevitable. The best recycling can do is to delay; complete closure of material loops to achieve 100 percent recycling of nonrenewables is impossible as micro-trace materials dissipate into the environment causing severe damage to the planet's ecosystems. Historically, this was identified as the metabolic rift by Karl Marx, who identified the unequal exchange rate between energy and nutrients flowing from rural areas to feed urban cities that create effluent wastes degrading the planet's ecological capital, such as loss in soil nutrient production. Energy conservation also leads to what is known as Jevon's paradox, where improvements in energy efficiency lowers the cost of production and leads to a rebound effect where rates of consumption and economic growth increases.

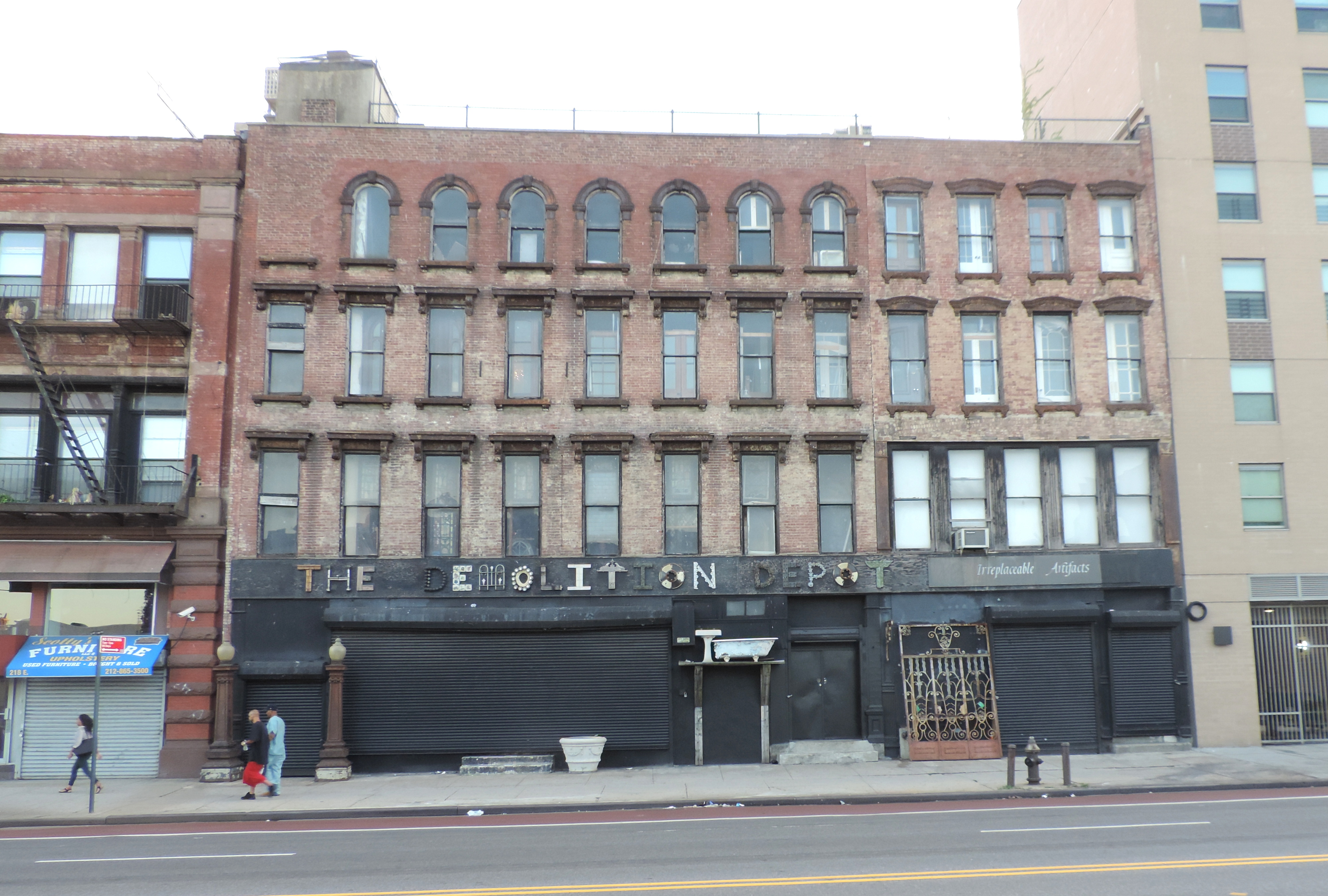
This shop in New York only sells items recycled from demolished buildings.

=== Economic costs ===
Journalist John Tierney notes that it is generally more expensive for municipalities to recycle waste from households than to send it to a landfill and that "recycling may be the most wasteful activity in modern America."

The amount of money actually saved through recycling depends on the efficiency of the recycling program used to do it. The Institute for Local Self-Reliance argues that the cost of recycling depends on various factors, such as landfill fees and the amount of disposal that the community recycles. It states that communities begin to save money when they treat recycling as a replacement for their traditional waste system rather than an add-on to it and by "redesigning their collection schedules and/or trucks".

In some cases, the cost of recyclable materials also exceeds the cost of raw materials. Virgin plastic resin costs 40 percent less than recycled resin. Additionally, a United States Environmental Protection Agency (EPA) study that tracked the price of clear glass from 15 July to 2 August 1991, found that the average cost per ton ranged from $40 to $60 while a USGS report shows that the cost per ton of raw silica sand from years 1993 to 1997 fell between $17.33 and $18.10.

Comparing the market cost of recyclable material with the cost of new raw materials ignores economic externalities—the costs that are currently not counted by the market. Creating a new piece of plastic, for instance, may cause more pollution and be less sustainable than recycling a similar piece of plastic, but these factors are not counted in market cost. A life cycle assessment can be used to determine the levels of externalities and decide whether the recycling may be worthwhile despite unfavorable market costs. Alternatively, legal means (such as a carbon tax) can be used to bring externalities into the market, so that the market cost of the material becomes close to the true cost.

=== Working conditions and social costs ===
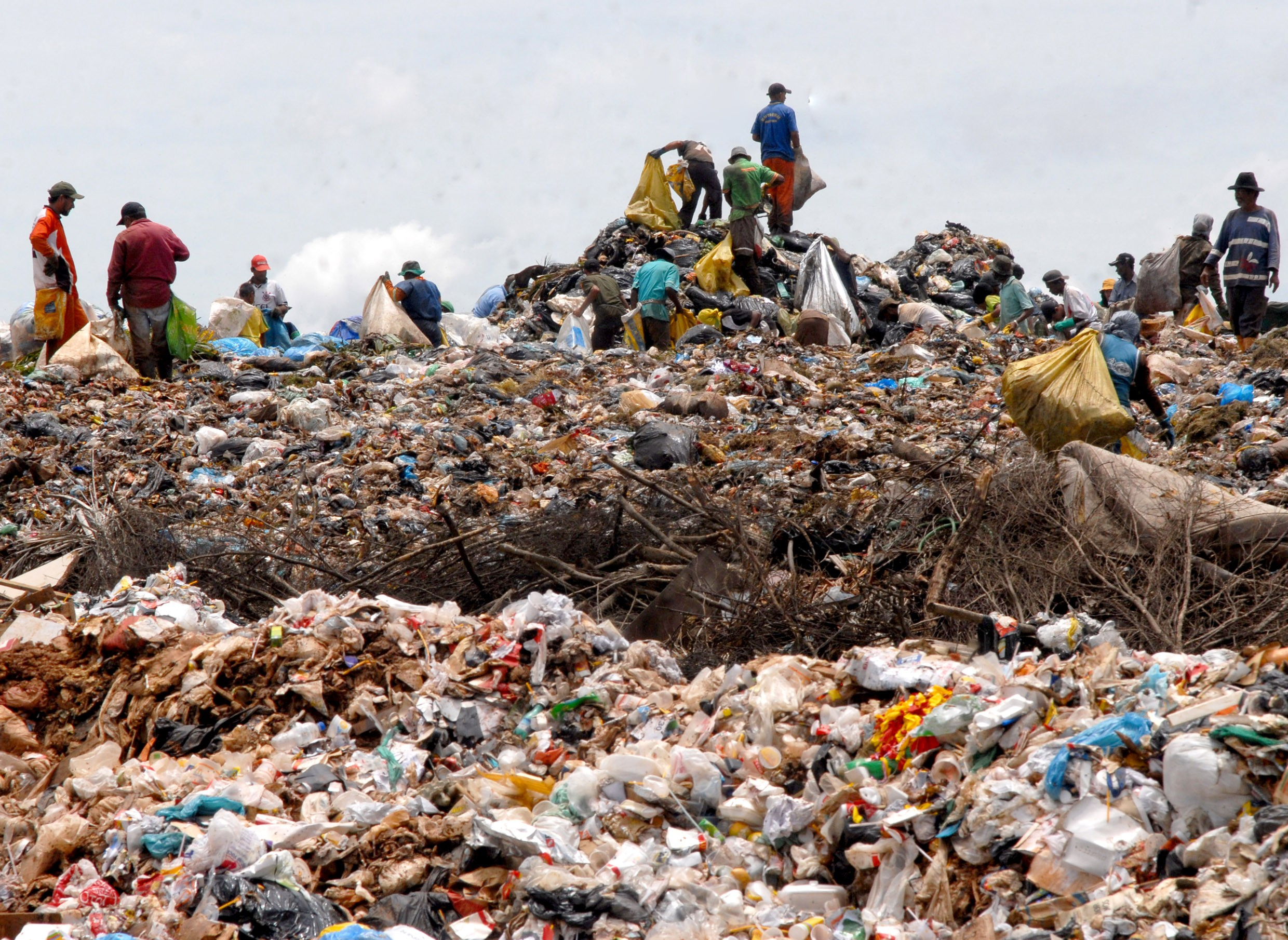
Some people in Brazil earn their living by collecting and sorting garbage and selling them for recycling.

The recycling of waste electrical and electronic equipment can create a significant amount of pollution. This problem is specifically occurrent in India and China. Informal recycling in an underground economy of these countries has generated an environmental and health disaster. High levels of lead (Pb), polybrominated diphenylethers (PBDEs), polychlorinated dioxins, and furans, as well as polybrominated dioxins and furans (PCDD/Fs and PBDD/Fs), concentrated in the air, bottom ash, dust, soil, water, and sediments in areas surrounding recycling sites. These materials can make work sites harmful to the workers themselves and the surrounding environment.

In some countries, recycling is performed by the entrepreneurial poor such as the karung guni, zabbaleen, the rag-and-bone man, waste picker, and junk man. With the creation of large recycling organizations that may be profitable, either by law or economies of scale, the poor are more likely to be driven out of the recycling and the remanufacturing job market. To compensate for this loss of income, a society may need to create additional forms of societal programs to help support the poor. Like the parable of the broken window, there is a net loss to the poor and possibly the whole of a society to make recycling artificially profitable, e.g. through the law. However, in Brazil and Argentina, waste pickers/informal recyclers work alongside the authorities, in fully or semi-funded cooperatives, allowing informal recycling to be legitimized as a paid public sector job.

Because the social support of a country is likely to be less than the loss of income to the poor undertaking recycling, there is a greater chance for the poor to come in conflict with the large recycling organizations. This means fewer people can decide if certain waste is more economically reusable in its current form rather than being reprocessed. Contrasted to the recycling poor, the efficiency of their recycling may actually be higher for some materials because individuals have greater control over what is considered "waste".

One labor-intensive underused waste is electronic and computer waste. Because this waste may still be functional and wanted mostly by those on lower incomes, who may sell or use it at a greater efficiency than large recyclers.

Some recycling advocates believe that laissez-faire individual-based recycling does not cover all of society's recycling needs. Thus, it does not negate the need for an organized recycling program. Local government can consider the activities of the recycling poor as contributing to the ruining of property.

== Public participation rates ==
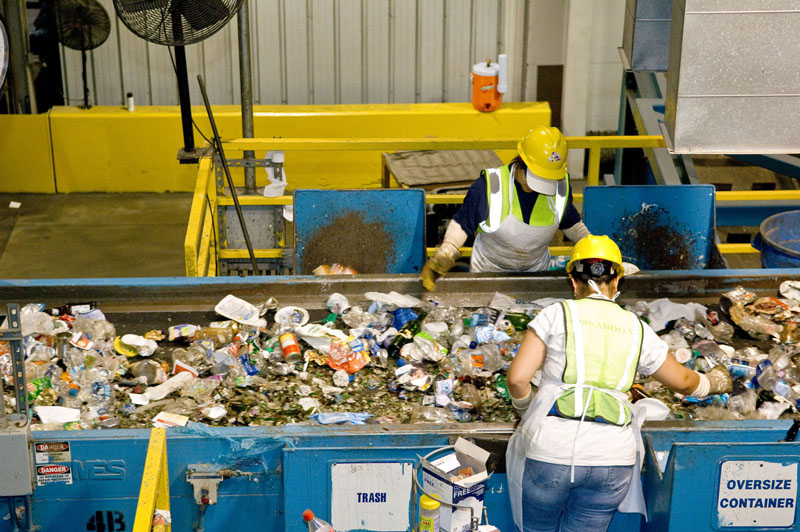
Single-stream recycling increases public participation rates, but requires additional sorting.

Better recycling is a priority in the European Union, especially in Central and Eastern Europe among respondents of the 2020–21 European Investment Bank Climate Survey.

Changes that have been demonstrated to increase recycling rates include:

- Single-stream recycling
- Pay as you throw fees for trash

In a study done by social psychologist Shawn Burn, it was found that personal contact with individuals within a neighborhood is the most effective way to increase recycling within a community. In her study, she had 10 block leaders talk to their neighbors and persuade them to recycle. A comparison group was sent fliers promoting recycling. It was found that the neighbors that were personally contacted by their block leaders recycled much more than the group without personal contact. As a result of this study, Shawn Burn believes that personal contact within a small group of people is an important factor in encouraging recycling. Another study done by Stuart Oskamp examines the effect of neighbors and friends on recycling. It was found in his studies that people who had friends and neighbors that recycled were much more likely to also recycle than those who did not have friends and neighbors that recycled.

Many schools have created recycling awareness clubs in order to give young students an insight on recycling. These schools believe that the clubs actually encourage students to not only recycle at school but at home as well.

Recycling of metals varies extremely by type. Titanium and lead have an extremely high recycling rates of over 90%. Copper and cobalt have high rates of recycling around 75%. Only about half of aluminum is recycled. Most of the remaining metals have recycling rates of below 35%, while 34 types of metals have recycling rates of under 1%.

"Between 1960 and 2000, the world production of plastic resins increased 25 times its original amount, while recovery of the material remained below 5 percent." Many studies have addressed recycling behaviour and strategies to encourage community involvement in recycling programs. It has been argued that recycling behavior is not natural because it requires a focus and appreciation for long-term planning, whereas humans have evolved to be sensitive to short-term survival goals; and that to overcome this innate predisposition, the best solution would be to use social pressure to compel participation in recycling programs. However, recent studies have concluded that social pressure does not work in this context. One reason for this is that social pressure functions well in small group sizes of 50 to 150 individuals (common to nomadic hunter–gatherer peoples) but not in communities numbering in the millions, as we see today. Another reason is that individual recycling does not take place in the public view.

Following the increasing popularity of recycling collection being sent to the same landfills as trash, some people kept on putting recyclables on the recyclables bin.

== Recycling in art ==
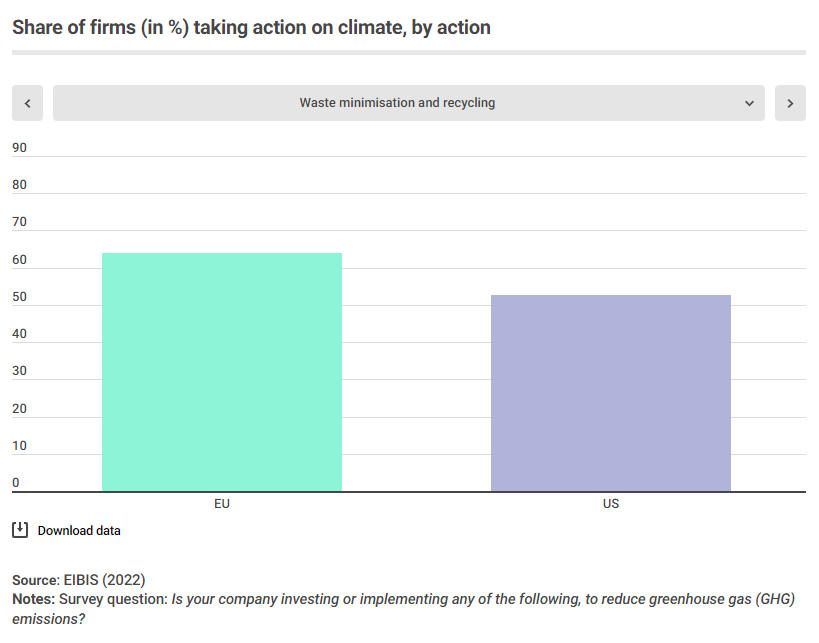
A survey showing the share of firms taking action by recycling and waste minimisation

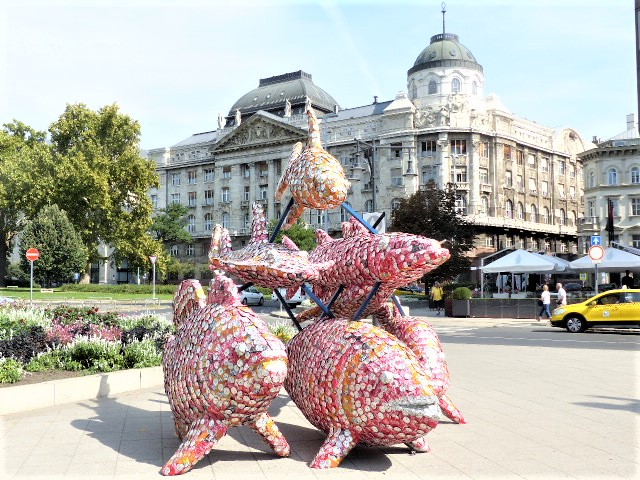
Uniseafish – made of recycled aluminum beer cans

Art objects are more and more often made from recycled material.

== Embracing a circular economy through advanced sorting technologies ==
By extending the lifespan of goods, parts, and materials, a circular economy seeks to minimize waste and maximize resource utilization. Advanced sorting techniques like optical and robotic sorting may separate and recover valuable materials from waste streams, lowering the requirement for virgin resources and accelerating the shift to a circular economy.

Community engagement, such as education and awareness campaigns, may support the acceptance of recycling and reuse programs and encourage the usage of sustainable practices. One can lessen our influence on the environment, save natural resources, and generate economic possibilities by adopting a circular economy using cutting-edge sorting technology and community engagement. According to Melati et al., to successfully transition to a circular economy, legislative and regulatory frameworks must encourage sustainable practices while addressing possible obstacles and difficulties in putting these ideas into action.

== See also ==
- 2000s commodities boom
- Aircraft recycling
- Appliance recycling
- Automotive oil recycling
- Bottle recycling
- Drug recycling
- E-cycling
- Electronic waste recycling
- Energy recycling
- Greening
- List of elements facing shortage
- List of waste management acronyms
- Mobile phone recycling
- Nutrient cycle
- Optical sorting
- Paint recycling
- Pallet crafts
- PET bottle recycling
- Plastic recycling
- Reclaimed lumber
- Reclaimed water
- Recycling bin
- Recycling by product
- Recycling rates by country
- Recycling symbol
- Resource recovery
- Refurbishment (electronics)
- Reuse
- Rigs-to-Reefs
- Scrap
- Textile recycling
- Timber recycling
- Tire recycling
- Upcycling
- USPS Post Office Box Lobby Recycling program
- Water heat recycling
- Water recycling shower
- Wishcycling
