= Benjamin Law (inventor) =

British businessman and inventor

Benjamin Law was born around 1773 in Gomersal, Yorkshire, the son of George Law and Mary Wilby. He is credited by many authors as the inventor of the shoddy process. Benjamin Law set up his business at Howley Mill.

A memorial to Benjamin Law is in the grounds of Batley Parish Church.

An exhibition of "shoddy art", challenging misconceptions about disabled people, was held in Batley in May 2016. The history of the shoddy process was the conceptual starting point for the disabled artists, who used recycled and reused textile materials in their artworks. The exhibition was first shown in Leeds, and was chosen to tour in Batley, given that it is shoddy's birthplace.
