= Recycled wool =

Textile made from shredded and respun wool

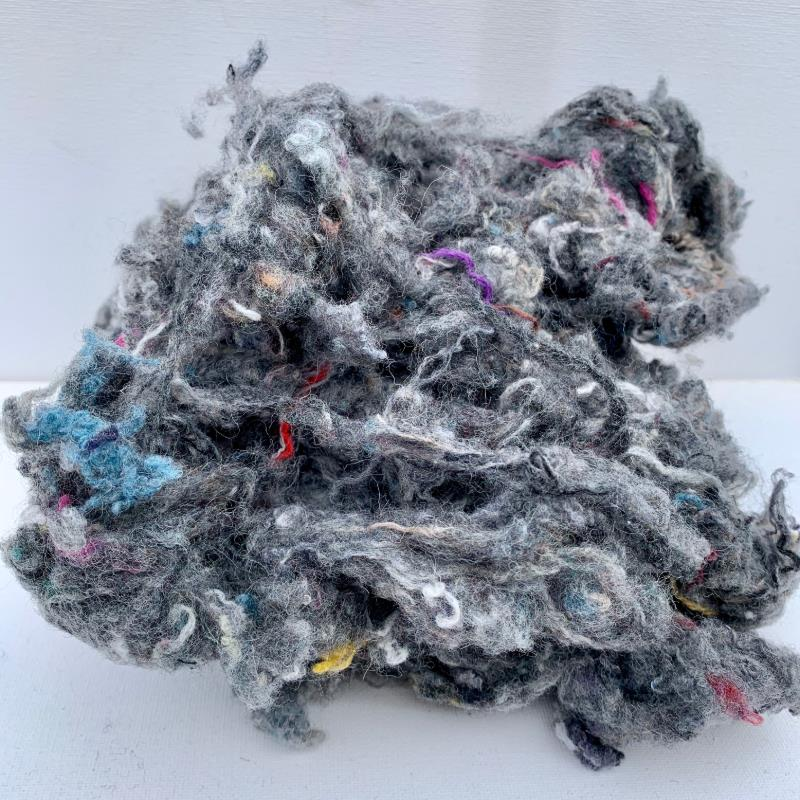
A pile of recycled wool

Recycled wool, also known as rag wool or shoddy, is any woollen textile or yarn made by shredding existing fabric and re-spinning the resulting fibres. Textile recycling is an important mechanism for reducing the need for raw wool in manufacturing.

Benjamin Law of Batley, England, invented shoddy in 1813. The shoddy trade became the dominant industry of Batley and neighbouring towns in the West Riding of Yorkshire, known as the Heavy Woollen District, in the 19th and early 20th centuries. Following a decline in the United Kingdom, the centre of the shoddy trade shifted to the city of Panipat in India. Efforts have been made to revive the British recycled-wool industry in the 21st century.

== Terminology ==
Historically, recycled wool products were called rag wool. Manufacturers distinguished among three main categories of rag wool:

- Shoddy – made from loosely woven or "soft" textiles that could be pulled apart relatively easily;
- Mungo – made from "hard" fabrics such as felts, that were harder to disintegrate but resulted in a finer product;
- Extract – made from the wool portion of cotton/wool blended fabrics.

In practice, few outside the industry were aware of these distinctions, even when rag wool was widely used. The common name was shoddy, which became a generalised term for poor quality goods. It is still used as a technical term for recycled wool within the industry.

Regulators in the United States make a distinction between reprocessed wool, which is made from manufactured wool products that were never used by the consumer, and reused wool, which the consumer has used. Other bodies refer to these as pre-consumer and post-consumer waste material.

The terms virgin wool and new wool are used to distinguish newly produced, never-used wool from shoddy.
