= Ghana Innovation Marketplace =

Logo

Ghana Innovation Marketplace 2009, abbreviated as GIM 2009, is an innovation competition that seeks innovative strategic solutions to Ghana's growing problem of solid waste management. The World Bank Group, in collaboration with the Government of Ghana, and other partners are sponsoring GIM 2009 to recognise and fund social entrepreneurs, small-actors and partner organisations/CSOs in the waste management sector.

This programme is being launched under the auspices of the Ministry of Local Governments and Rural Development in Accra, Kumasi, Sekondi-Takoradi, Tamale and Tema, the five metropolitan areas supported by the Second Urban Environmental Sanitation Project.

== Theme ==
GIM, which was a collaborative effort between the government, World Bank and development partners, was on the theme, "Solid waste: Big problem, big opportunity".

There are three sub-themes:

- Collection: sorting, reduction, transportation
- Value addition: recycling, composting, energy production
- Advocacy and education: research, raising public awareness

== Awards ==
GIM 2009 will have three categories of awards:

- At metropolitan level, up to ten (10) awards per city at a range of GH¢ 5,000 – GH¢ 10,000
- At national level, up to ten (10) winners at a range of GH¢ 10,000 – GH¢ 50,000
- Up to fifty (50) other projects will receive various non-financial awards and recognitions

== NGOs ==
The registered non-profit Trashy Bags was launched in 2007 in order to increase public awareness of Ghana's solid plastic waste problem and clean up sachets from the streets of Accra. This company buys waste from collectors. After washing and drying the sachets, it sews them into fashionable bags and other products which are then sold in Accra and exported to eight other countries around the world. The Trashy Bags Company has collected 20 million plastic sachets since its founding, and employs 60 machinists.
