= Glass milk bottle =

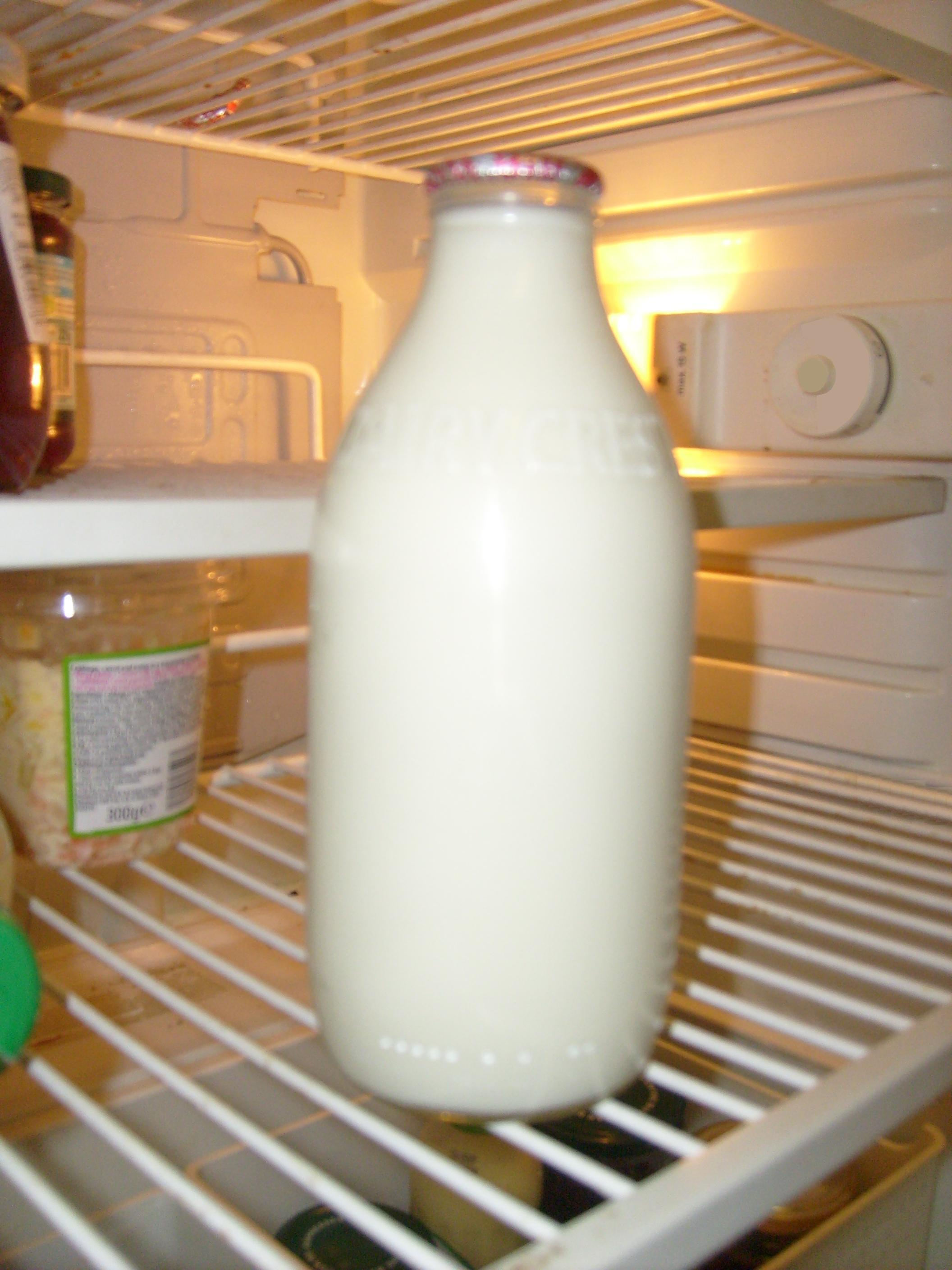
A modern British milk bottle owned by Dairy Crest

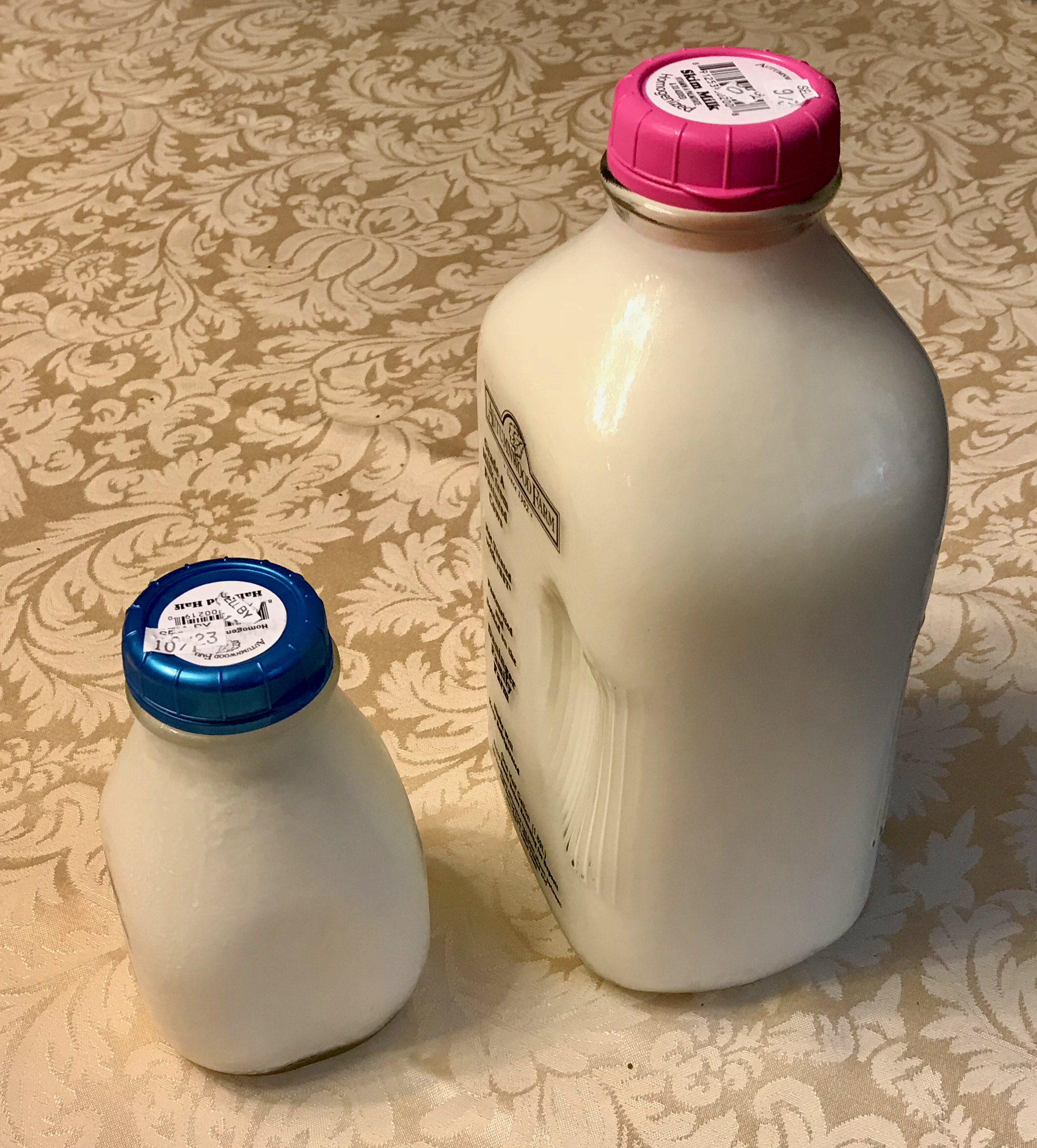
Pint and half gallon returnable glass bottles

From the second half of the 19th century, milk has been packaged and delivered in reusable and returnable glass bottles. They are used mainly for doorstep delivery of fresh milk by milkmen. Once customers have consumed the milk, empty bottles are expected to be rinsed and left on the doorstep for collection, or rinsed bottles may be returned to a participating retail store. Bottle sizes vary depending on region, but common sizes include pint, quart or litre.

More recently, plastic bottles have been commonly used for milk. These are often made of high-density polyethylene (HDPE) which is intended for a single use and is easily recyclable. Other plastic milk containers are also in use.

== History ==
=== United States ===
Before the introduction of modern milk bottles, workers known as milkmen would go door to door to fill their customers' jugs. The most valuable milk bottles are embossed or pyro-glazed (painted) with the names of dairies on them, these were used for the home delivery of milk so the milk bottles could be returned to their respective dairies.

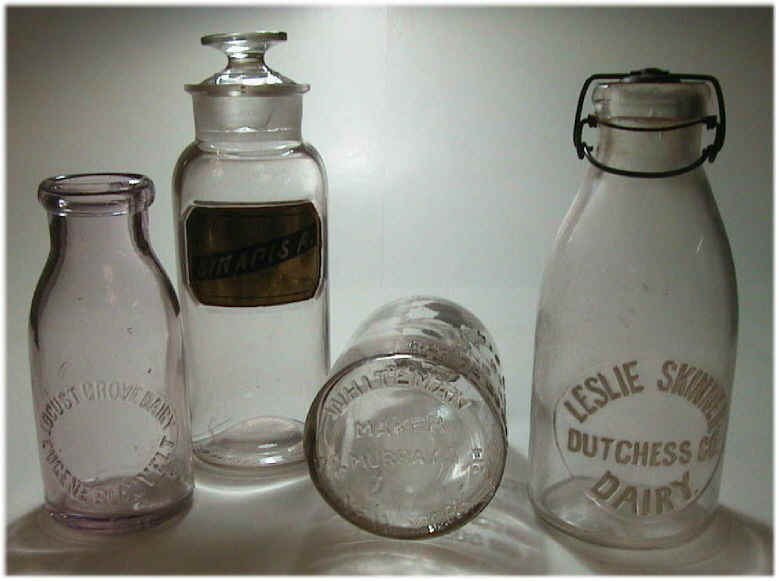
Examples of milk bottles from the late 19th century made by the Warren Glass Works Company

Extending from the 1860s to the 1890s, there were several experimental "jars" that were not patented but were used to carry milk and were healthier. The milk jar of the Tuthill Milk Company/Tuthill's Dairy of Unionville is an example of one of these early jars that features a ground lip and a base baring the mark of the pontil used to craft it. Other early milk jars during this time include the Mackworth "Pure Jersey Cream" crockery jar, the Manorfield Stock Farm jar, the Manor, and the Pennsylvania wide-mouth jar. In 1878, George Henry Lester patented the first glass jar intended to hold milk.

This jar featured a glass lid that was held on the jar by a metal clamp. In the same year that Lester invented his milk jar, the Brooklyn milk dealer Alex Campbell was credited with first selling milk in experimental glass bottles. These bottles did not resemble common milk bottles.

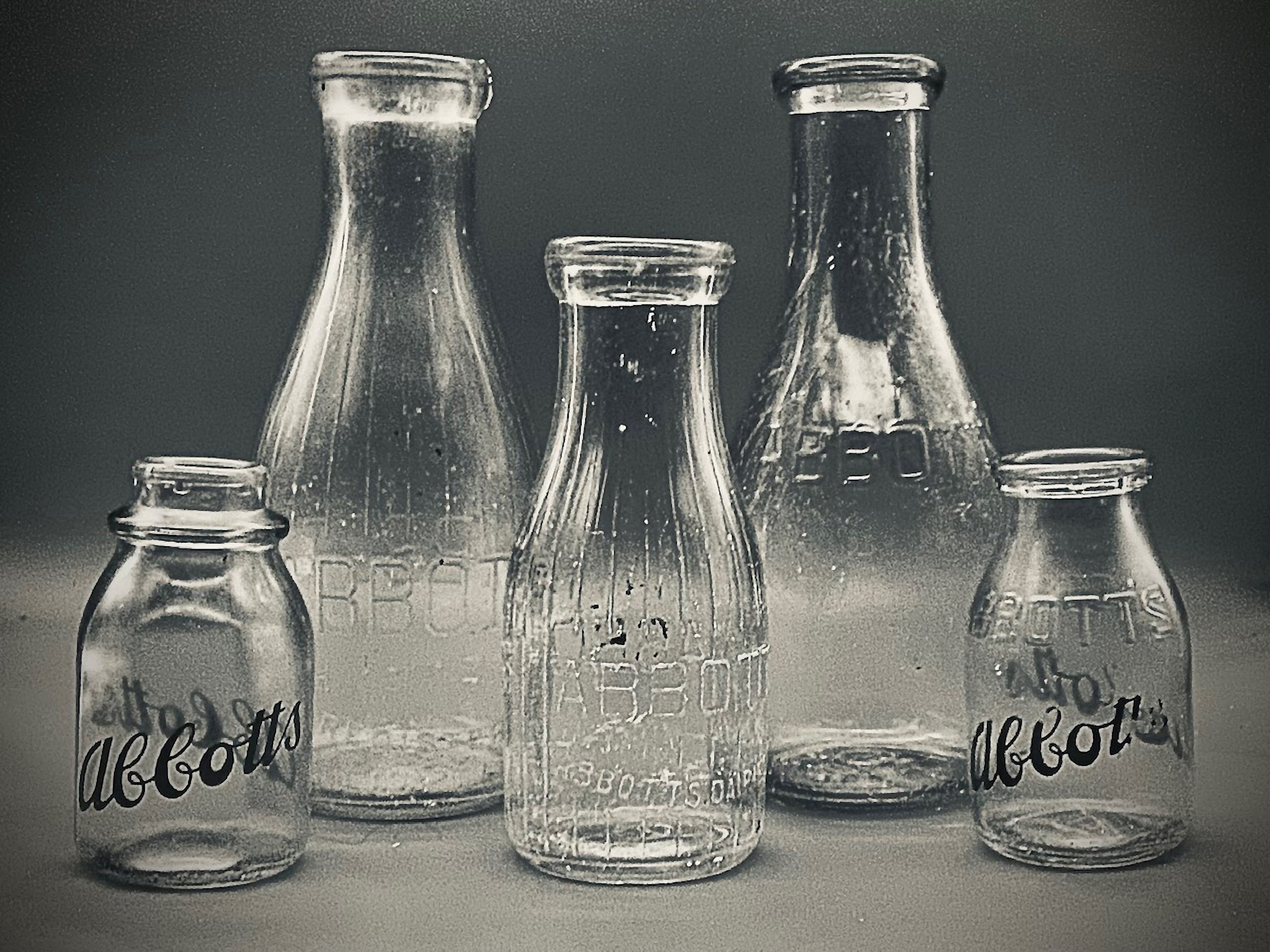
Five different Abbotts Dairies, Philadelphia, PA milk/cream bottles (c1920s–1960s)

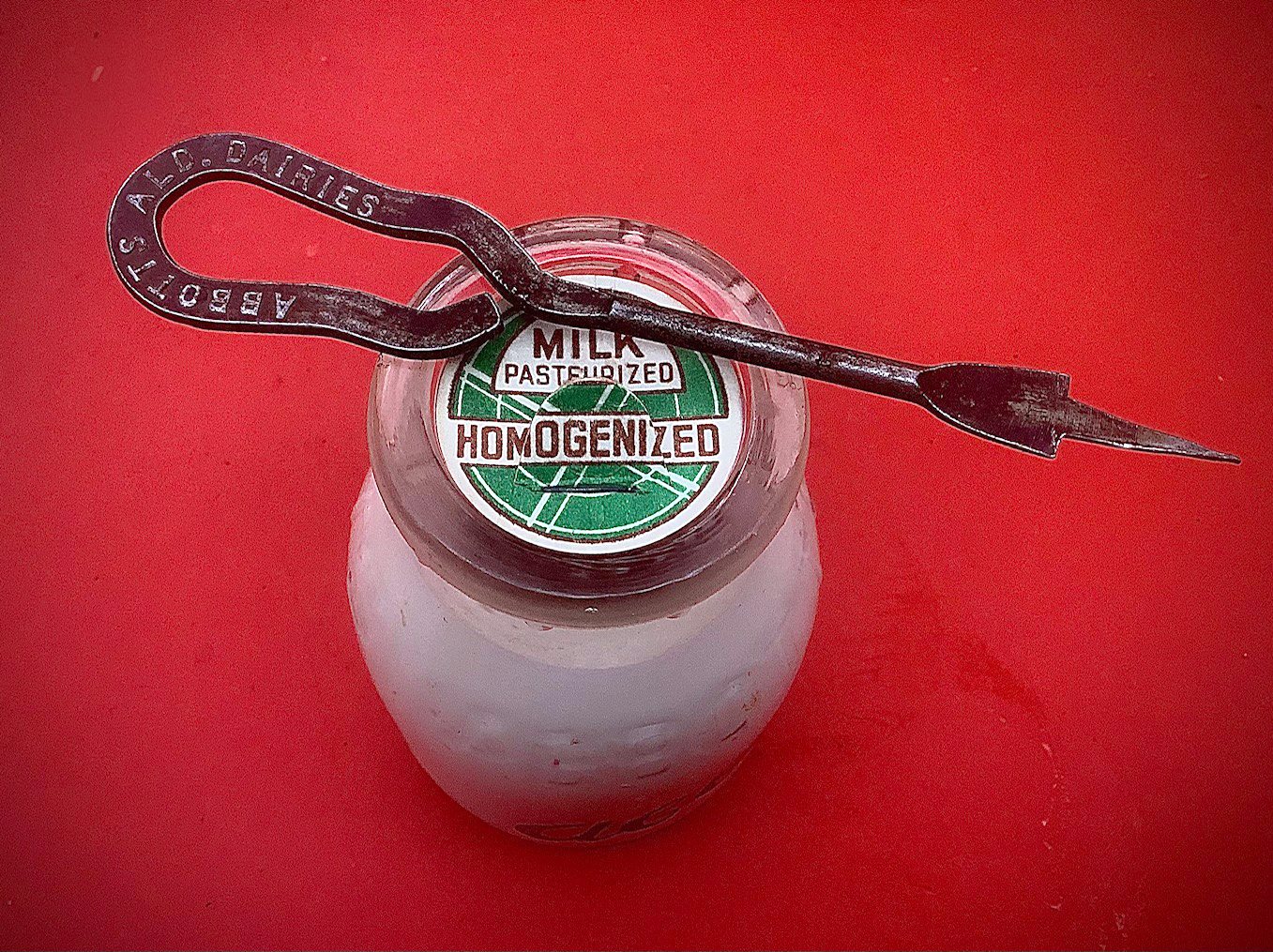
A reusable half-pint glass milk bottle sealed with a disposable cardboard cap opened by pulling on a flap lifted up with a pointed opening tool

Lewis P. Whiteman held the first patent for a glass milk bottle with a small glass lid and a tin clip. Following this, the next earliest patent was for a milk bottle with a dome style tin cap and was granted on September 23, 1884, to Whiteman's brother, Abram V. Whiteman. The Whiteman brothers produced milk bottles based on these specifications at the Warren Glass Works Company in Cumberland, Maryland, and sold them through their New York sales office.

The Original Thatcher is one of the most desirable milk bottles for collectors. The patent for the glass dome lid was dated April 27, 1886. There are several variations of this early milk bottle and many reproductions. During this time period, many types of bottles were being used to hold and distribute milk. These include a pop bottle type with a wire clamp, used by the Chicago Sterilized Milk Company, Sweet Clover, and others. Fruit jars were also used, but only the Cohansey Glass Manufacturing plant made them with dairy names embossed.

The Commonsense Milk Bottle with the first cap seat was developed as an economical means for sealing a reusable milk bottle by the Thatcher Manufacturing Company around 1900. Most bottles produced after this time have a cap seat.

By the 1920s, glass milk bottles had become the norm in the UK after slowly being introduced from the US before World War I.

Milk bottles before the 1930s were round in shape. However, in 1935, slender-neck bottles were introduced in the UK. In the 1940s, the square squat bottle became the more popular style. Milk bottles since the 1930s have used pyroglaze or ACL (Applied Color Label) to identify the bottles. Before the 1930s, names were embossed on milk bottles using a slug plate. The name was impressed on the slug plate, then it was inserted into the mold used to make the bottle – the result was the embossed name on the bottle. In 1980 a new bottle, nicknamed "dumpy," was introduced in the UK where it remains the standard now.

During the Second World War misuse or hoarding of milk bottles was made illegal in the United Kingdom. 2.5 million bottles were rescued. Milk Vessels Recovery Limited was founded in 1920 and engaged in recovery of aluminium bottle tops.

From the 1960s onward in the United States, with improvements in shipping and storage materials, glass bottles have almost completely been replaced with either LDPE coated paper cartons or recyclable HDPE plastic containers (such as square milk jugs), depending on the brand. These paper and plastic containers are lighter, cheaper and safer to both manufacture and ship to consumers.

In 1975, 94% of milk in the UK was in glass bottles, but as of 2012 this number was down to 4%.

There are concerns among a few Americans as to the quality and safety of industrialized milk. The local non-homogenized milk industry has seen a popular resurgence in certain markets in the US in the last decade or so. Because of this, the use of glass bottles in local or regional, non-industrial milk distribution has become an increasingly common sight.

== Chronology ==
- 1880 – British milk bottles were first produced by the Express Dairy Company, these were delivered by horse-drawn carts. The first bottles used a porcelain stopper top held on by wire. Lewis Whiteman patents the glass milk bottle with a glass lid.
- 1884 – Dr. Thatcher invents the glass milk container in New York. These were initially sealed with wooden plugs, which proved unsuccessful, and were soon replaced by glass stoppers.
- 1894 – Anthony Hailwood developed the milk pasteurisation process to create sterilized milk, which could be safely stored for longer periods.
- 1920 – Advertisements began to appear on milk bottles. A sand-blasting technique was used to etch them on the glass.
- 1930s – Increased prevalence of battery electric vehicles as milk floats
- mid-1950s – Paperboard tops were deemed unhygienic and banned in some locations. Delivery by horse-drawn carts was still common.
- early-1990s – The advertising largely disappeared with the introduction of infrared bottle scanners designed to check cleanliness.

== Present day ==
In some locations around the world, different coloured tops on milk bottles indicate the fat content. Unpasteurized is often green-topped. However other colour designations may be used by some dairies. Bottles may also be marked, stamped or embossed with the name of the dairy.

In the United Kingdom, the aluminium foil tops on glass milk bottles are normally coloured:

Colour		Meaning
	Gold	Channel Island milk
	Silver	Whole milk (unhomogenized)
	Red	Homogenized whole milk
◢	Red & silver stripe	Semi-skimmed milk
◢	Dark blue & silver stripe	Skimmed milk
	Orange	1% Fat milk
	Green	Unpasteurised milk sold at the farm gate

Historically, other colours such as Pink for Ultra-High Temperature (UHT) processed milk, were also used. Blue was previously used for so termed, 'sterilized' milk.

Modern dairies may also use refillable plastic bottles, as well as plastic bottle tops. The colour coding for plastic milk bottle tops can be different from that of glass bottles. In the United Kingdom, the plastic tops on plastic milk bottles are normally coloured:

Colour	Meaning
Gold	Channel Island milk
Blue	Homogenized whole milk
Green	Semi-skimmed milk
Red	Skimmed milk
Orange	1% Fat milk

In the United Kingdom, milk sold to the door comes in imperial pints. However, sterilized milk sold to the door typically comes in 500 ml glass bottles, which are 'non-returnable' and have colour coded lids that match the colour codes normally seen on plastic bottles. Milk which is sold in returnable containers, such as glass bottles, are not required to be labelled in metric units. Milk which is sold in pre-packaged containers that are non-returnable must be labelled in metric units. In the supermarkets, bottled milk mostly comes in a pint or multiples of a pint, and are also labelled in metric equivalents. Some retail store sales of milk in glass bottles is available in certain regions of the United Kingdom with a bottle deposit.

With lower milk consumption, milk in Hong Kong is sold in both glass and plastic bottles as well as in cartons. The glass milk bottles are sold in supermarkets, convenience stores and in small restaurants. The glass milk bottle carries a deposit of 1 Hong Kong dollar. More commonly available in the market in glass milk bottles are Kowloon Dairy and Trappist Dairy with different shaped glass milk bottles with both in school bottle size.

Orange juice and other fruit juices are also sold in doorstep deliveries in the same style of bottle used for milk. Typically these have an aluminium foil top colour coded to indicate the flavour.

In some countries (e.g. Estonia and some provinces of Canada), it is common to buy milk in a milk bag.

While the proportion of sales in milk bags in the United Kingdom is quite low, semi-skimmed milk is sold in bags by Dairy Crest/Milk and More, and in Sainsbury's supermarket it is available in whole-milk, semi-skimmed-milk and skimmed-milk options. However supermarket availability is limited to larger branches.

== School milk bottles ==
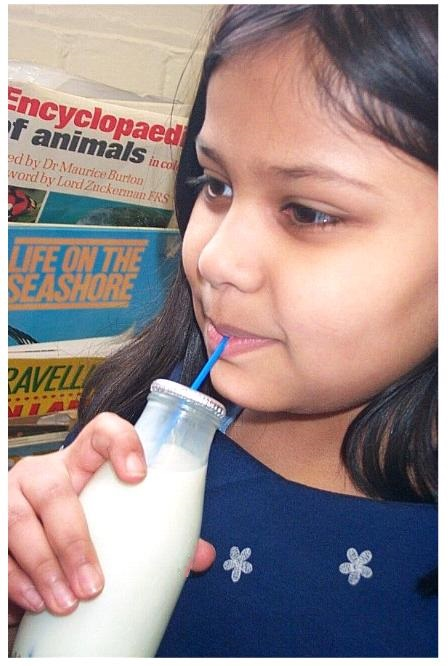
A primary school child drinking milk out of a glass bottle with a straw piercing the aluminium foil cap

Small third-of-a-pint glass milk bottles were developed in the United Kingdom during the mid-20th century in order to supply milk to children attending primary school. They were the most common form of packaging for school milk in the early 1970s, but have been gradually superseded by third pint cartons and plastic bottles. Leicester, South Tyneside, Leeds, and Kirklees were the last local authorities where school milk was supplied in third of a pint glass bottles until the dairies ceased using them in 2007.

Children usually drank their milk using a straw inserted into the bottle.

== See also ==
- Milk bag
- Packaging
- Reuse of bottles
- Plastic milk container
- Beverage opener
