= Water sachet =

Water distributed in a plastic bag

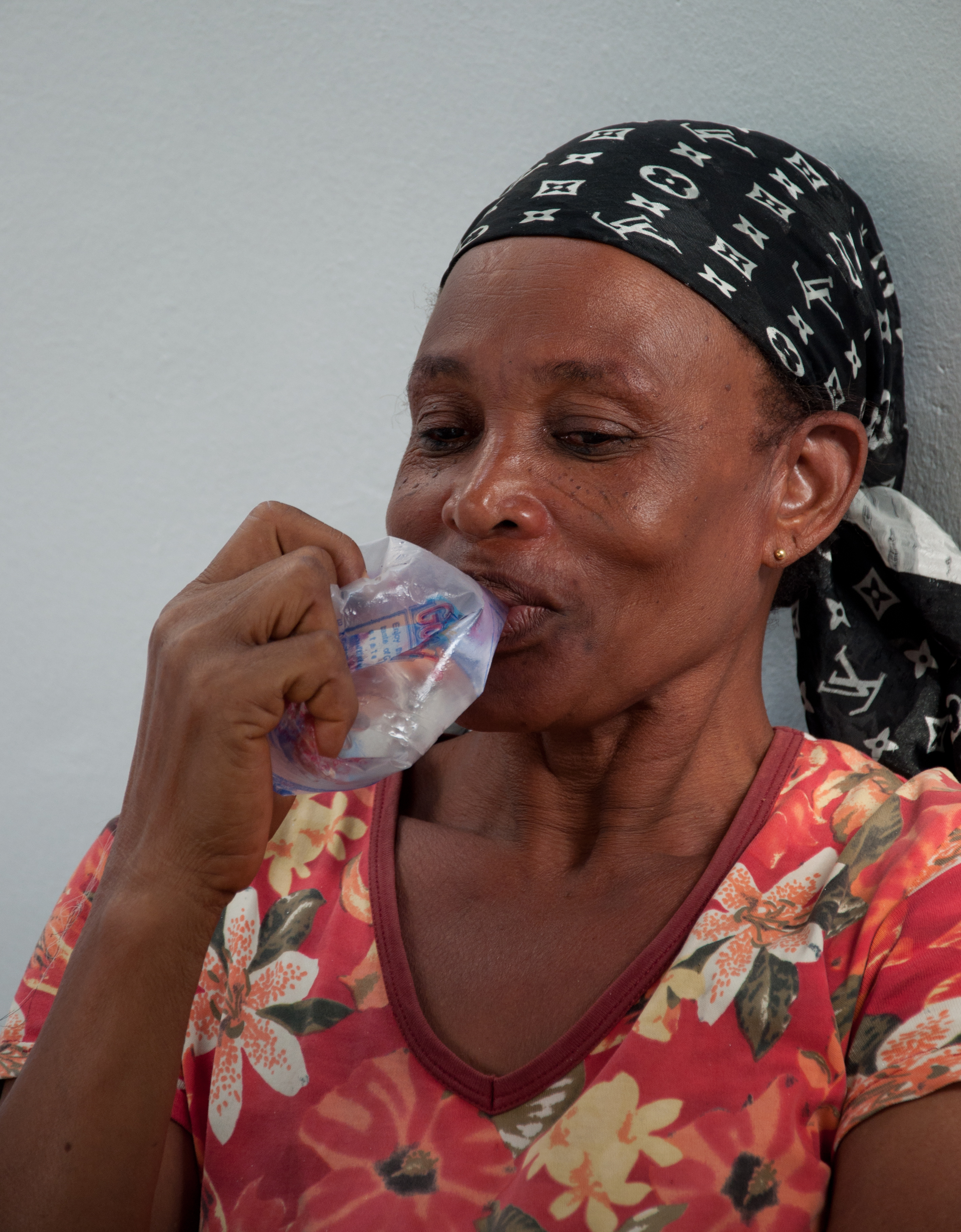
A woman drinking from a plastic sachet.

Water sachets or sachet water is a common form of selling pre-filtered or sanitized water in plastic, heat sealed bags in parts of the global south, and are especially popular in Africa. Water sachets are cheaper to produce than plastic bottles, and easier to transport. In some countries, water vendors refer to sachet water as "pure water".

High demand, and poor collection of waste from consumers, has resulted in significant plastic pollution and waste from sachets throughout West Africa. Accumulation of sachets frequently causes blocked stormwater drainage, and other issues. Some countries, such as Senegal, have banned disposable sachets.

Because sachets are frequently filled in small and often unregulated facilities, inadequate sanitary conditions can occasionally result in disease or contamination. However, in countries like Ghana consumers still prefer sachet water over other vendors and forms of water access, perceiving sachets to be of lower risk. This form of water distribution provides vital access to water in communities that otherwise would not have it. However, some scholars have identified this method of distribution as having potential human rights and social justice implications, limiting the right to water and sanitation.

== Health concerns ==
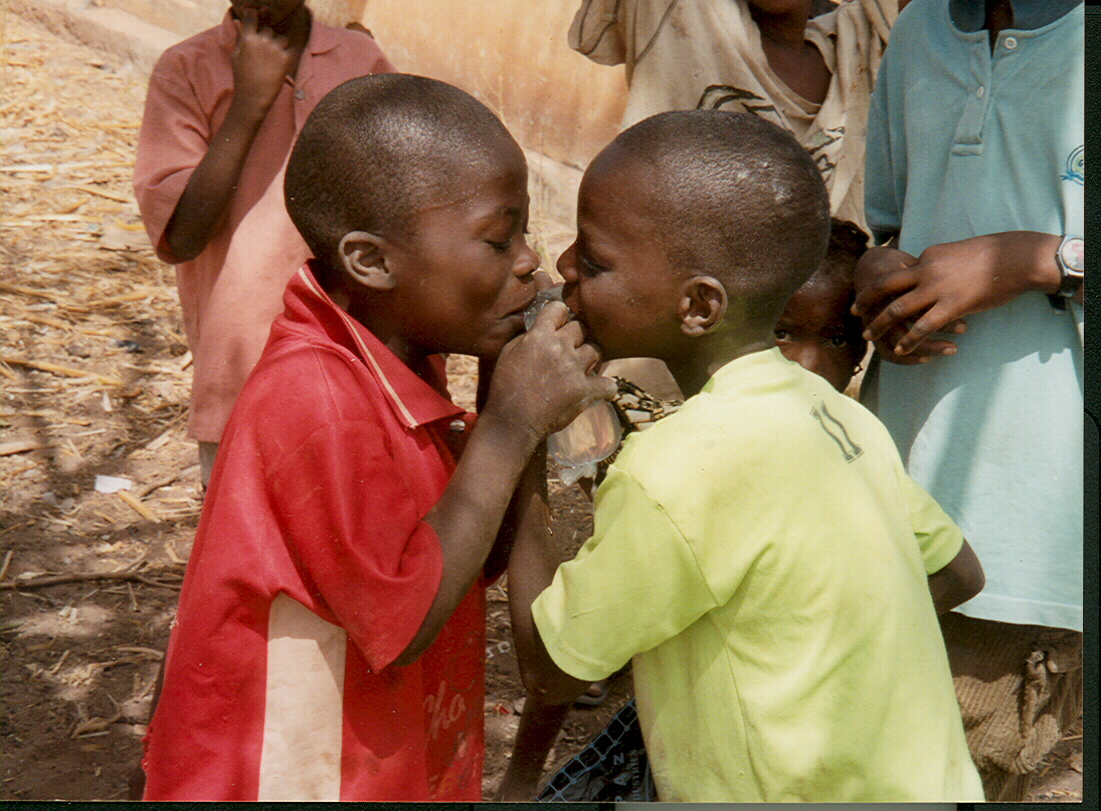
Two children sharing a water sachet in Koundara, Guinea

Studies of sachets frequently find improper sanitary conditions among sachet producers. One study of sachets in Port Harcourt, Nigeria found that sachet water has significant contamination from various disease causing microbes. Prolonged storage of the sachets found human-health threatening levels of the microbes after 4 months in several of the samples. Similarly following the onset of the COVID pandemic, in Damongo found 96% of producers didn't have adequate sanitary measures.

== By country ==
=== Ghana ===
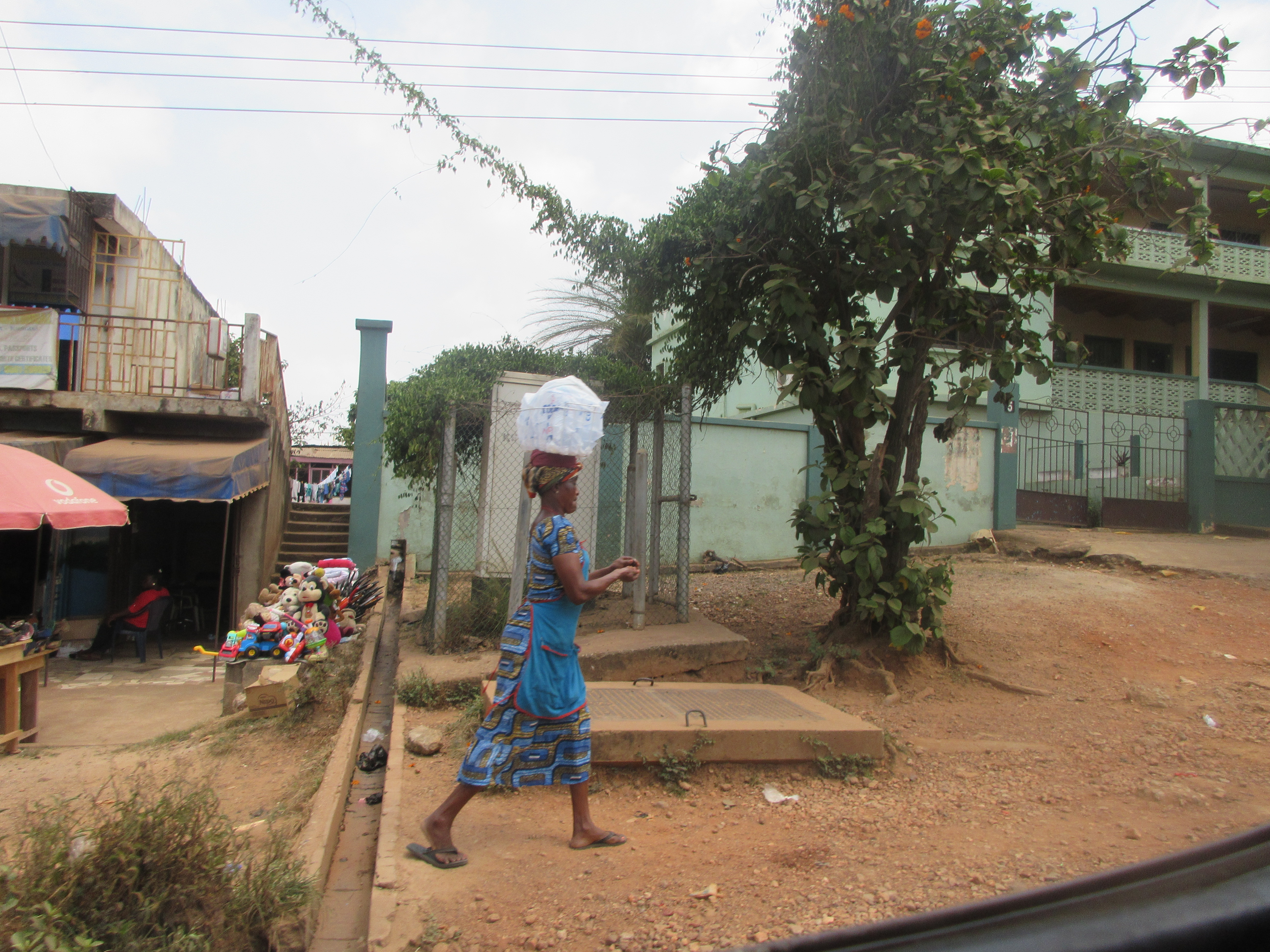
A sachet water seller in Ghana

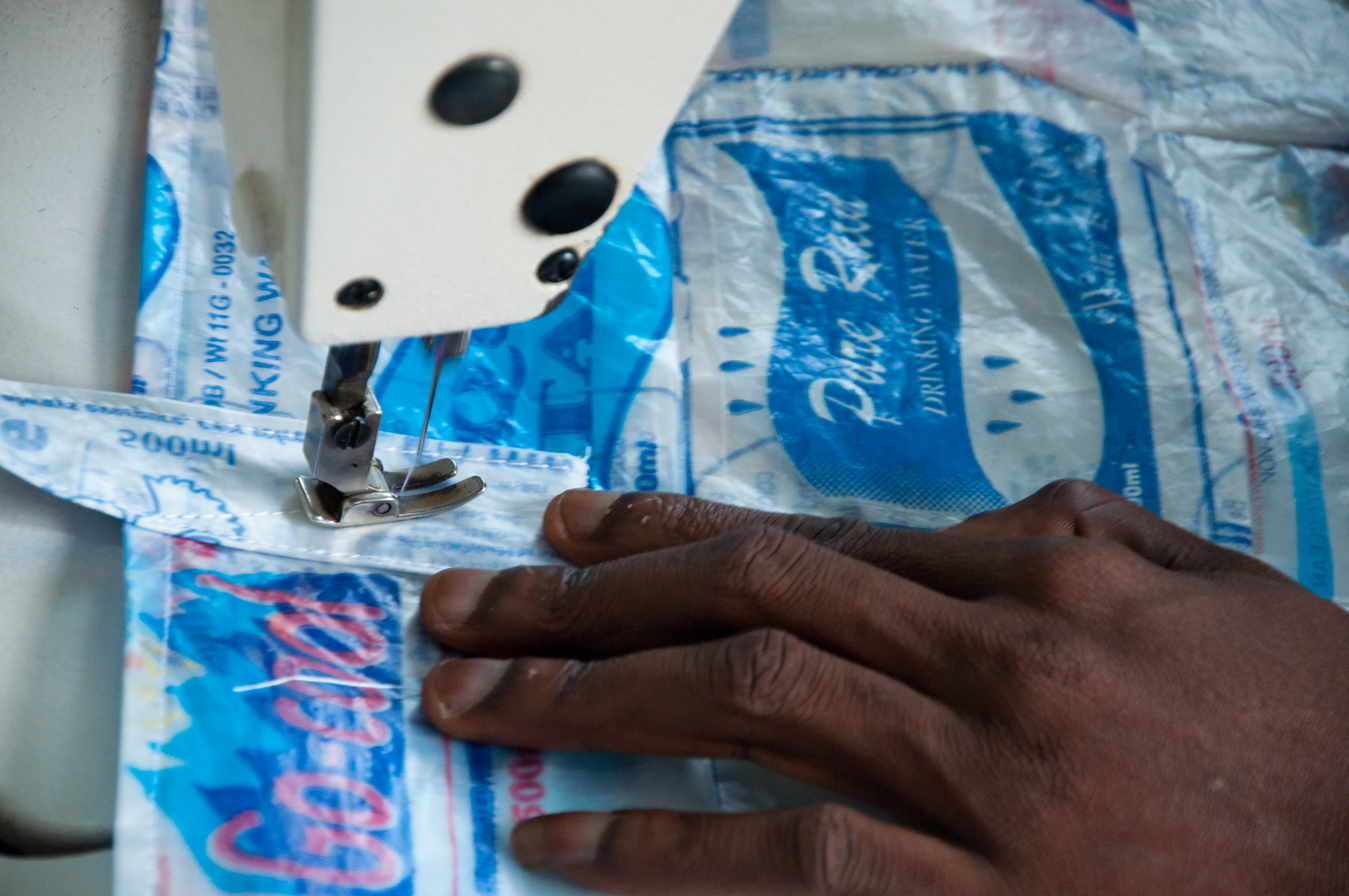
Upcycling of water sachets by the non-profit Trashy Bags into reusable shopping bags in Ghana.

Sachet water is common through Ghana. A 2012 review of sachet use in Ghana found sachet water ubiquitous especially in poorer communities. Sachets were typically 500 ml polyethylene bags, and heat sealed at each end. Sachet water delivery is part of a larger trend in delivery by private water vendors from municipal taps.

Packaging water in small plastic bags started in the 1990s, and that practice grew after the introduction of Chinese machines for filling and heat sealing bags. A price increase in 2022, saw significant changes in the sales in the Ashanti region.

=== Nigeria ===
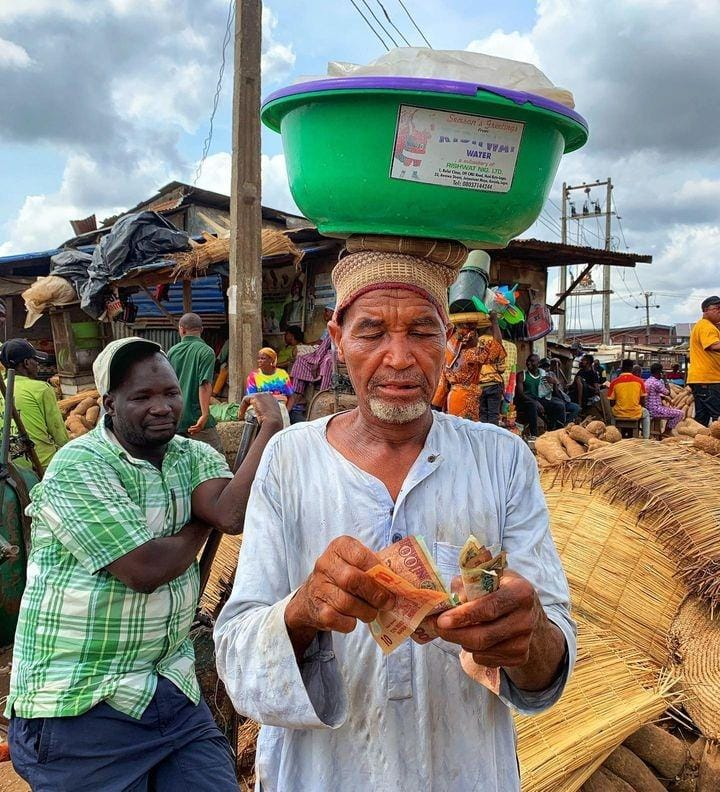
Sachet water seller in Lagos, Nigeria

Sachet water has become increasingly important part of the water access in Nigeria, especially fast growing cities like Lagos. The cost of Sachet water is dependent on economic changes. In 2021, the Association for Table Water Producers of Nigeria increased the price of bag of sachet water to 200 naira due to increase in production cost. A significant devaluation of local currency led to significant price increases in 2022.

In 2024, sachet water currently sells for N50 per sachet. A bag (20 sachets) sells between N400 and N500, the increase is due to changes in the economy. In some regions, the high cost of sachets triggered a revival of vendors selling "ice water", chilled borehole water tied in nylon sacks, at a much lower price than sealed sachets .

Around June, 2024 two water companies were closed in Owerri by National Agency for Food Drugs Administration and Control (NAFDAC) due to poor manufacturing process and unhygienic production. The two factories including Elmabo Table Water and Sylchap Table Water while Giver Table water was cautioned for minor issues.

== See also ==
- Drinking water
- Milk bag
- Purified water
- Self-supply of water and sanitation
- WASH – Water supply, sanitation and hygiene
- Water kiosk
