= Square milk jug =

One type of US gallon plastic container

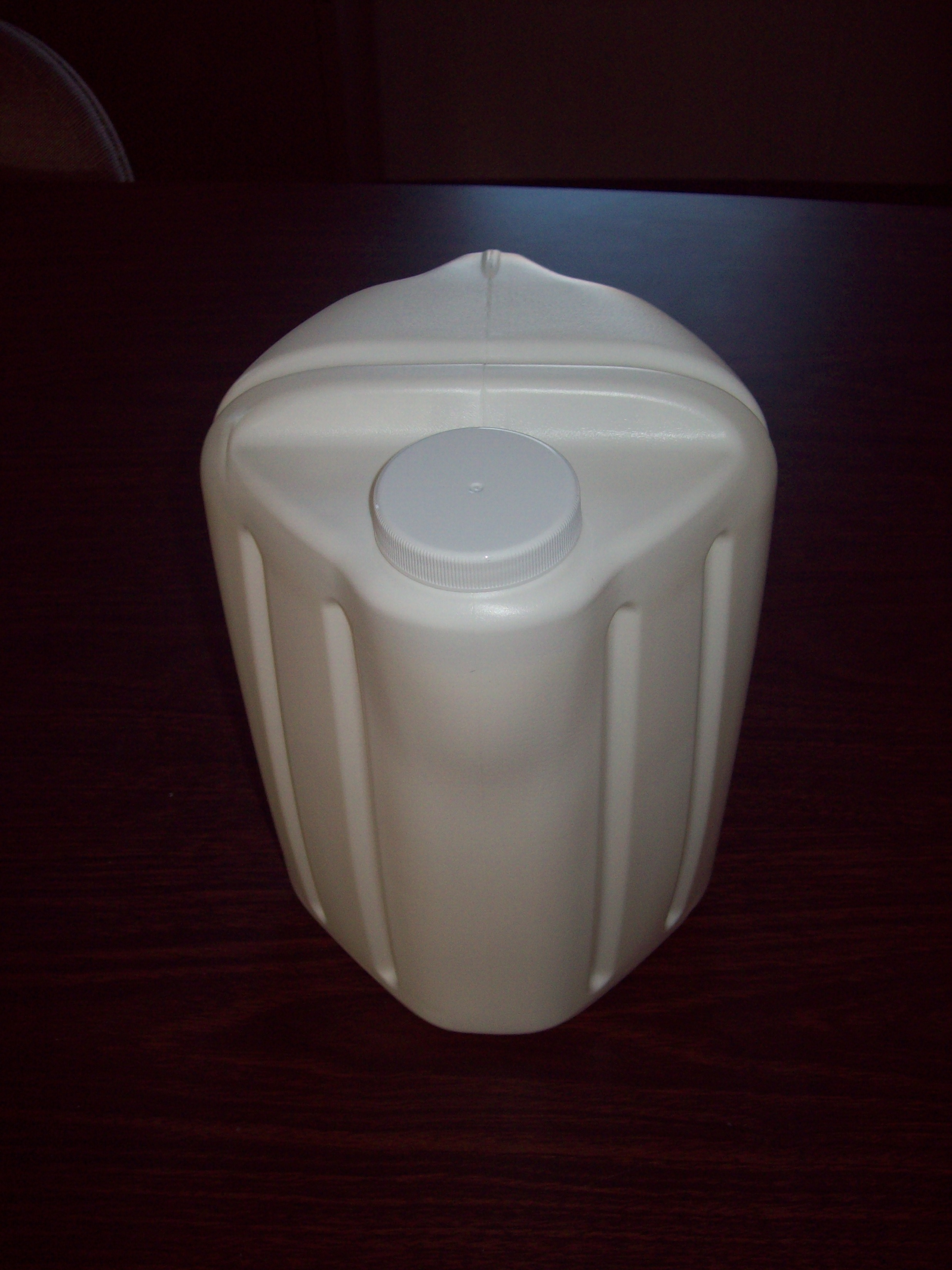
A square milk jug

The square milk jug is a variant of the one-gallon (3.785 liters) plastic milk container sold in the United States. The design was introduced in the summer of 2008 and is marketed as environmentally friendly because of the shape's advantages for shipping and storage (better cube efficiency).

Square milk jugs are stackable and 9% more can be shipped in the same space. They also eliminate the need for milk crates, which are required for traditional bell-shaped jugs.

== Pouring technique ==
The technique used to pour milk from a square milk jug is different from that of a traditional milk jug. A Sam's Club representative suggests "tilt it slowly and pour slowly" and a dairy owner in Yerington, Nevada, where some square milk jugs are filled, described the pouring technique as "rock-and-pour instead of a lift-and-tip".

== Design ==
Environmental benefits and cost savings are the primary stated benefits of square milk jugs, although there are noticeable trade-offs.

Because more milk fits on each truck, shipping costs can be reduced by half; this reduces the number of trucks on the road each year by 11000 (US estimate). Stores that required five shipments per week in traditional containers now only require two, resulting in lower fuel consumption. Instead of being packed in reusable crates, the square jugs are shrink wrapped for shipment; however, the hundreds of square feet of single-use polyethylene film "stretch wrap" used on each pallet raises significant new environmental concerns. If one pallet uses approximately 175 linear feet of film, a 40 x 48 inch pallet 6 feet tall will hold 80 cubic feet or 360 gallons of milk (given 4.5 gallons of milk per cubic foot), and require 1,056 square feet of film, equaling just under 3 square feet of film per gallon. Only around 5% of stretch wrap is actually recycled; the remainder contributes to significant environmental fallout.

Manufacturers claim that this rectangular design has cut water use by 67% to 70%, according to one dairy, since there are no crates to be cleaned; the absence of dirty crates also reduces the risk of jugs carrying contamination.

== Effect ==
Critics of square milk jugs have noted increased spillage and difficulty pouring. This is a problem specific to the gallon size that has a much larger mass when first opened.

There are also cost advantages resulting from lower shipping costs for the retailer and these can be passed on to the consumer. The cost to a consumer of a gallon of milk in a square milk jug is 10¢ to 20¢ cheaper than a gallon of milk in a traditional milk jug.

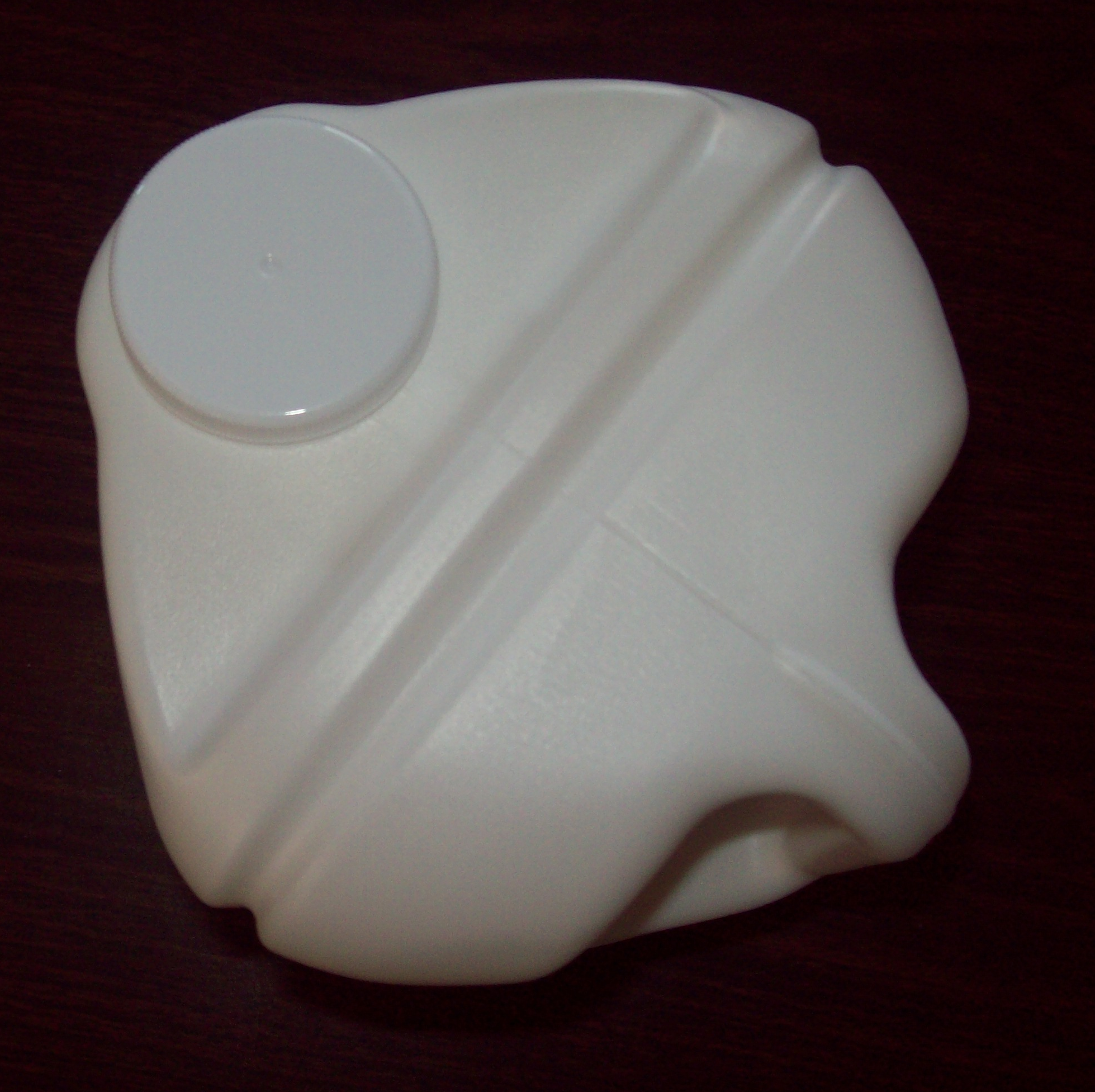
The top of a square milk jug. The ability to stack the square jugs was promoted as a cost saving improvement to the design.

Because square milk jugs can be stacked, they require less labor at the dairy, and can be packaged more quickly, which allows the milk to be shipped sooner, providing fresher milk to the retailer. The wide mouth is also easier to fill which reduces the likelihood of spillage and the sanitary issues caused by milk getting on the container.

The shape of the jug also allows more milk to be stored in a milk cooler. One Sam's Club store reported fitting 224 square gallon jugs in an area that only held 80 traditional one gallon jugs.

== Reception ==
Square milk jugs have been adopted by some Wal-Mart, Costco and Sam's Club stores.

Consumers have criticized the square milk jug for being difficult to pour, especially for children. When tilted shallowly, the larger opening (larger than a traditional milk jug), combined with its small lip, generates a wide stream of milk. This causes spills and leaks onto the sides of the container.

Some Sam's Club stores offered lessons on pouring, complete with complimentary cookies. Concern was also raised on the issue of the narrower base of the square jug, which allows it to be stored in the door of many refrigerators. Milk stored in this area may be more prone to spoiling due to frequent drastic changes in temperature.

== See also ==
- Milk bag
- Milk bottle
- Packaging and labeling
- Water canister
