= Milk bag =

Plastic bags that contain milk

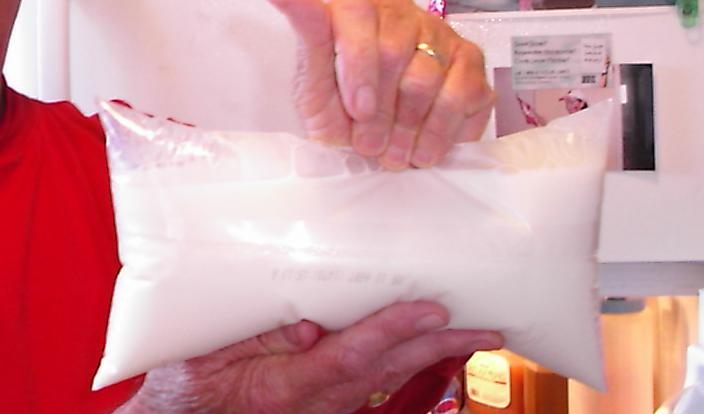
A milk bag

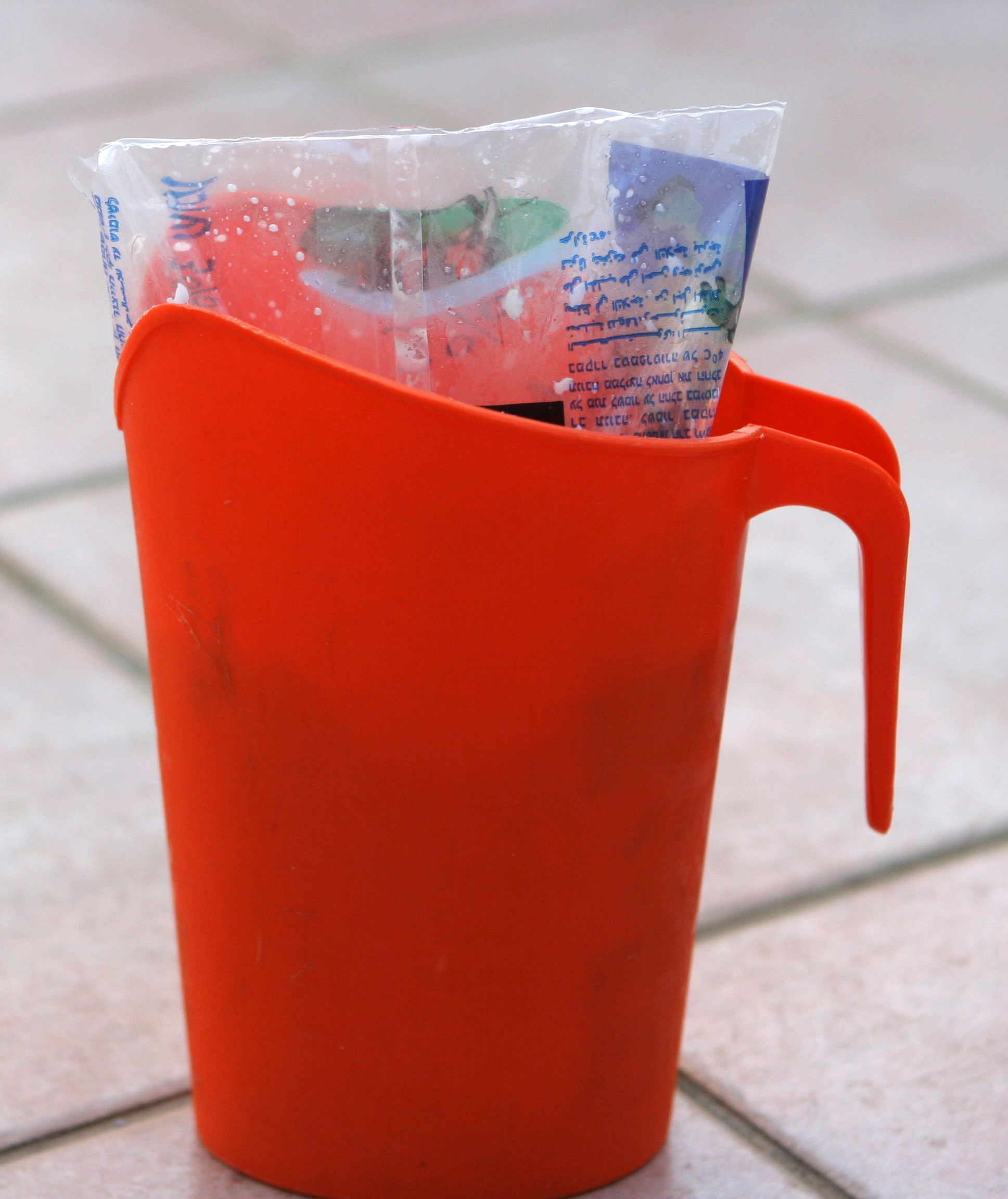
Pitcher used to hold a milk bag

A milk bag is a flexible plastic pouch used to package milk. Usually one of the corners is cut off to allow for pouring, and the bag is stored in a pitcher.

A typical milk bag contains approximately 1 L (1.8 imperial pints) of milk in South America, Iran, Israel, and continental European countries, while in Canada they contain 1 1/3 L (2.3 imp pt), and in India, 0.5 L (0.9 imp pt).

In the Baltic rim countries and some Eastern European countries, similar bags may also be seen used for packaging yogurt or kefir.

== Benefits ==
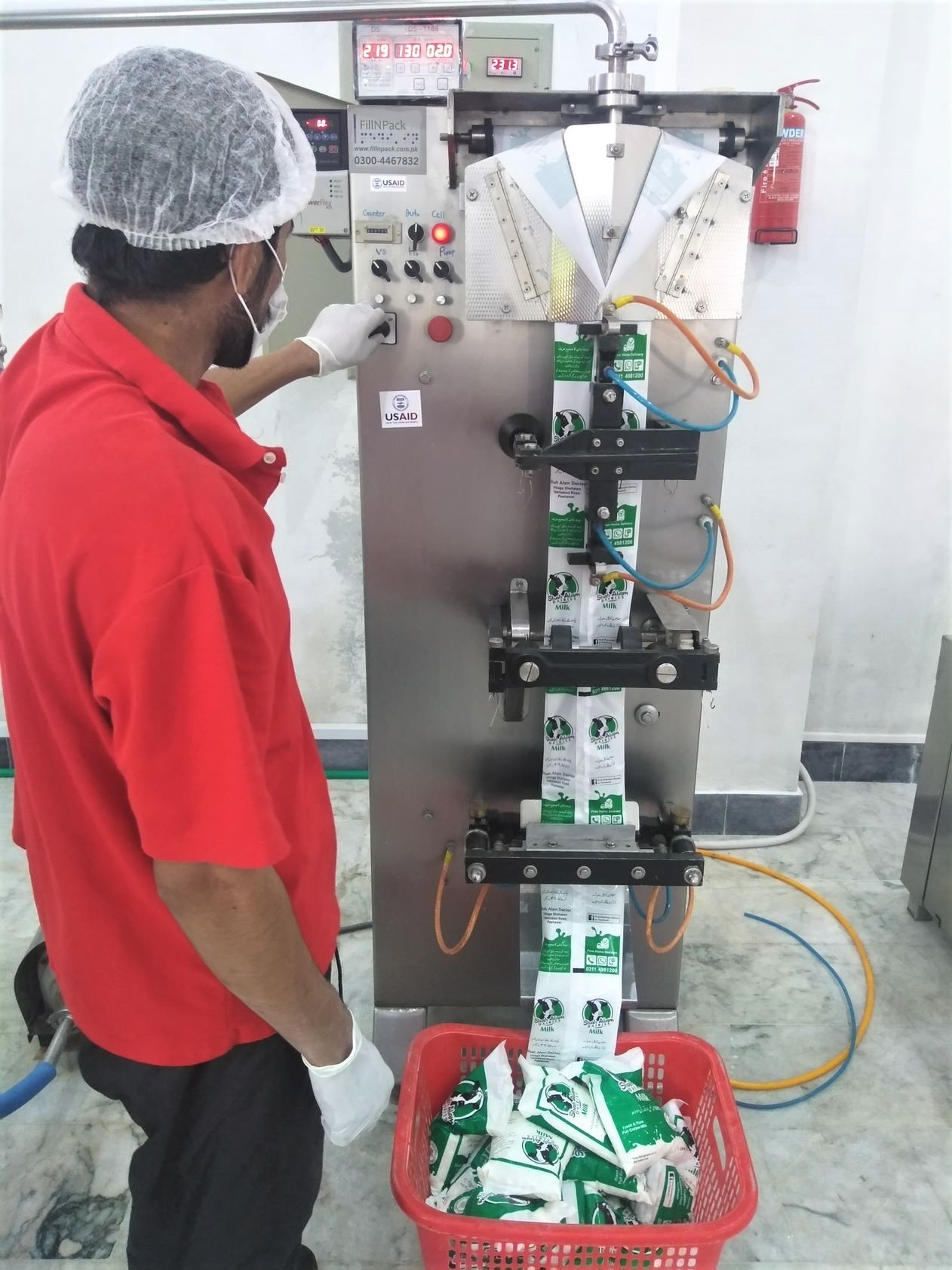
Packaging of milk bags in Pakistan

For producers, it is easier to vary portion size when sealing bags than cartons, as well as lowering the cost of packaging. Milk bags also take up less space in the garbage. For consumers, bags typically allow for smaller portion sizes. This theoretically reduces the risk of spoilage, as well as the space and location of storage in the fridge.

== Recycling ==
While milk bags use less plastic than standard plastic bottles or jugs, empty bags are often not accepted for recycling when mixed with other plastics. In Canada, where recycling services are municipally or regionally managed, milk bags may not always be recycled. In some municipalities milk bags are required to be discarded as garbage and in others they are recyclable.

== By country and region ==
This is not an exhaustive list of all the countries where bagged milk is commonly sold.

=== Canada ===
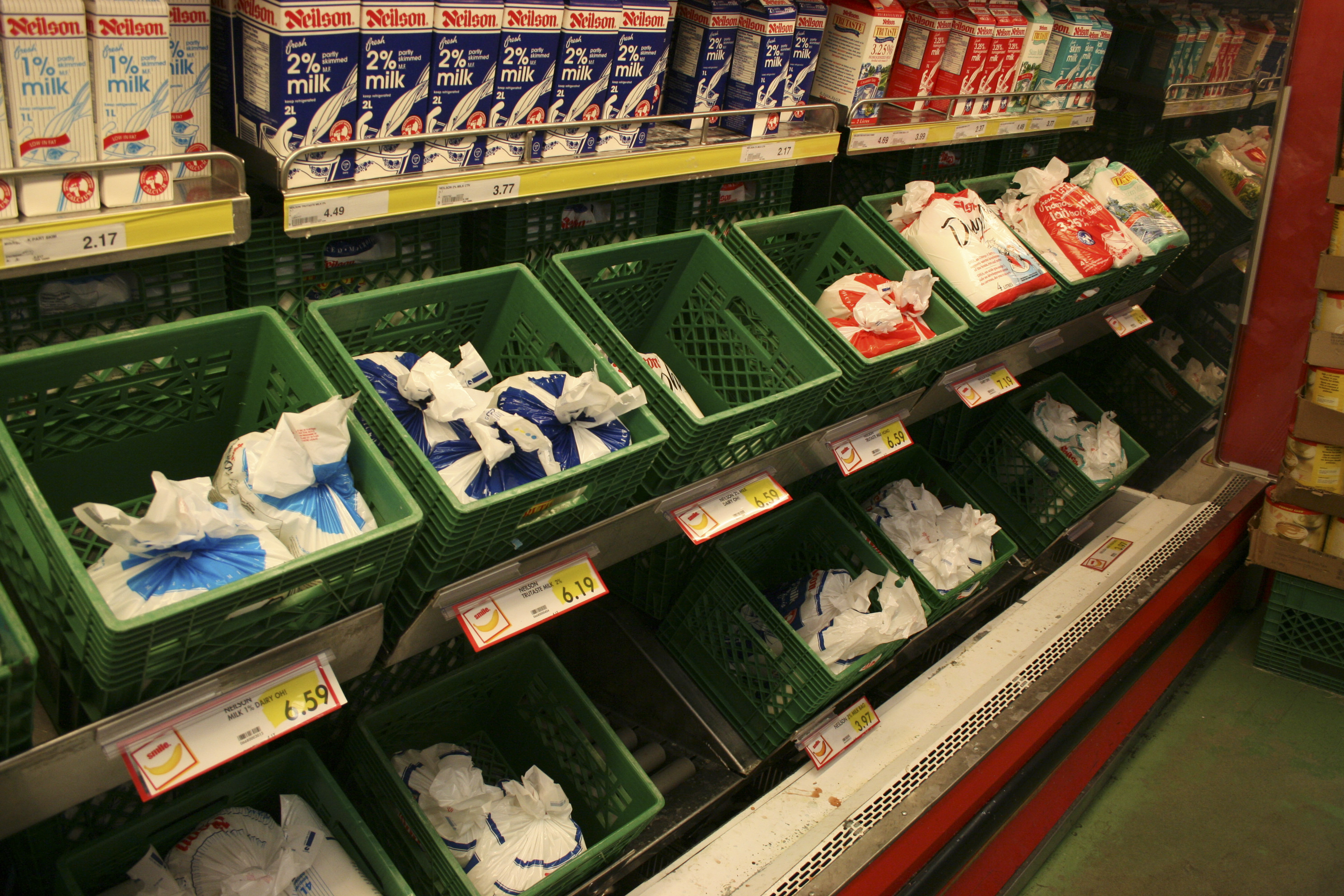
Neilson Dairy milk bags and cartons in Ontario, Canada

In Canada, milk was packaged in heavy, reusable imperial unit glass milk bottles, cardboard cartons and plastic jugs. In 1967, DuPont, using European equipment, introduced plastic bags to store and sell milk. These bags gained widespread acceptance in some parts of Canada due to 1970s metrication in Canada, when bottles, jugs, and cartons had to be redesigned and manufactured in metric units; milk bag packaging machines could easily be resized.

The consumer largely accepted the new containers in parts of Ontario, Quebec and the Maritimes in the 1970s. Regulation in Ontario that required retailers to collect a deposit on milk jugs, but not bags, also motivated the practice.

Milk bags are sold (typically packaged three in a larger 4L sack) in parts of Ontario, Quebec and the Maritimes. They are not common in western Canada.

=== India ===
Milk bags are commonplace in India, with an estimated 30% of milk sold in the country being packaged this way. There has been limited compliance from dairy businesses in buying back consumer plastic as required by the Maharashtra Pollution Control Board.

=== Israel ===
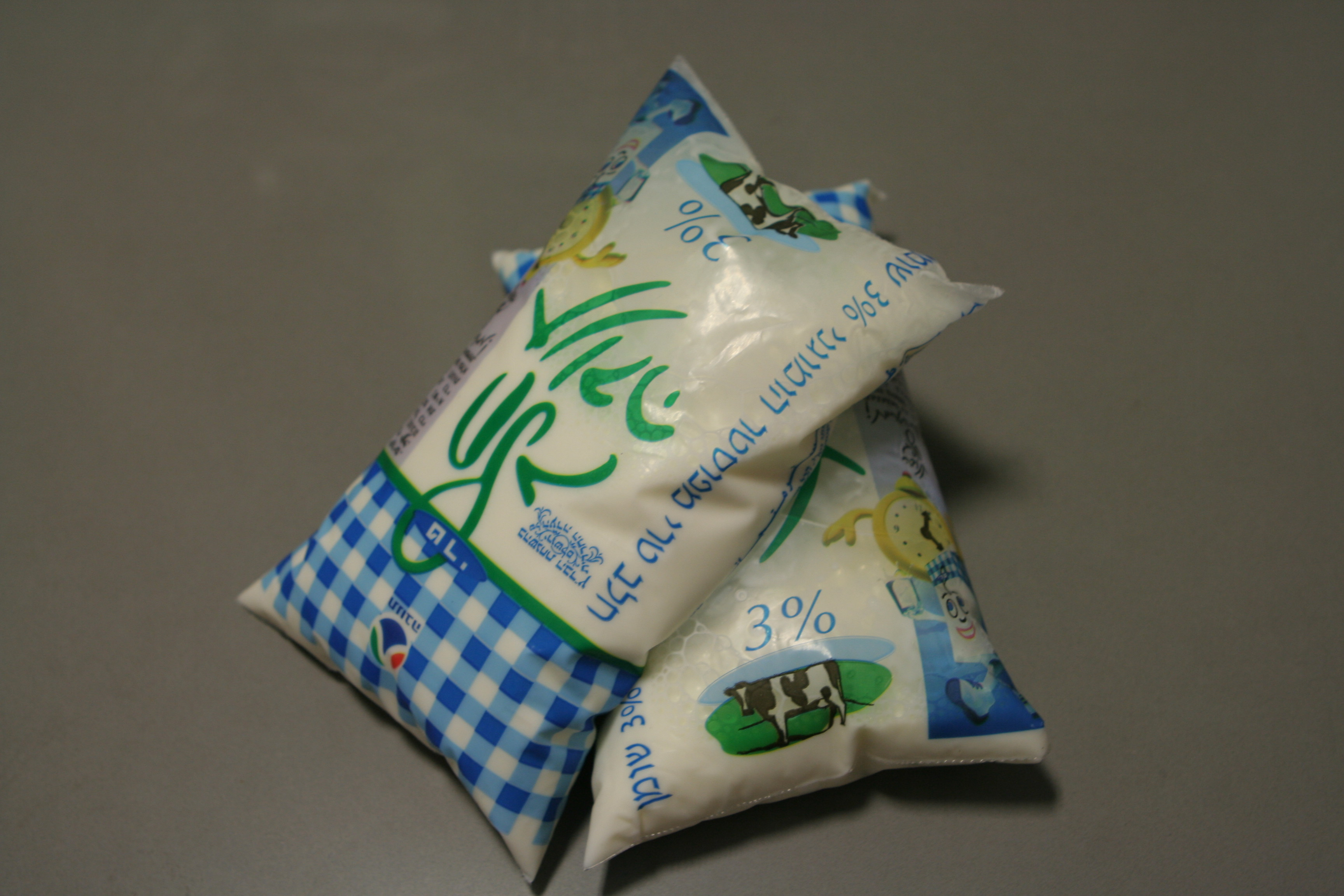
Israeli milk bags

In Israel, bags are the most common type of packaging for milk. They became the standard form of milk packaging in the 1960s, with the discontinuation of glass bottles. Milk bag prices are controlled by the state. Therefore, price differences exist between them and other alternatives like plastic bottles or cartons. Due to the price differences, a relationship was observed between the socioeconomic status of the consumer and the type of milk container that they customarily purchased. The higher the socio-economic status of the purchaser, the more likely they are to buy milk in cartons rather than in bags, despite the higher price of cartons. Based on these differences, Blue Square Network created a way to measure the socioeconomic status of an area based on the sales ratio of milk cartons versus bagged milk. The higher the ratio of the former to the latter, the higher the status of the region in Israel. For religious Jews, opening a bag of milk can be considered problematic on Shabbat, because the action requires cutting. Eli Yishai, Israel's former minister of internal affairs, used empty milk bags in the Knesset as props to complain about price-hikes in the cost of milk.

=== South America ===
Milk bags are also commonly used in Colombia, Ecuador, Argentina, Bolivia, Brazil, Chile, Paraguay, Peru, and Uruguay.

=== United Kingdom ===
In the United Kingdom, Sainsbury's began a pilot experiment on distributing milk in bags in 2008 in conjunction with Dairy Crest. It was originally targeted at 35 stores at the same price as a regular 2-imperial-pint (1.1 L) plastic bottle of milk. The product was expanded nationwide in 2010, at which point the bags retailed at a discounted price compared to traditional containers, but stopped in early 2015.

=== United States ===
DuPont introduced milk bags to American schools in 1989; by 1993 three million pouches a day were being served in 24 states. However, the popularity of them waned. There appears to only be one verified school district, in Omaha, NE, using bagged milk as recently as 2015.

=== European Union ===
A few countries of the European Union sell milk in bags, as well as in the other types of containers, such as in Estonia (e.g. brands like Farmi, Valio/Alma, or Pilos).

== See also ==
- Milk bottle
- Milk carton
- Plastic milk container
- Square milk jug
- Water sachet
