= Plastic milk container =

Plastic bottle used to store commercially sold milk

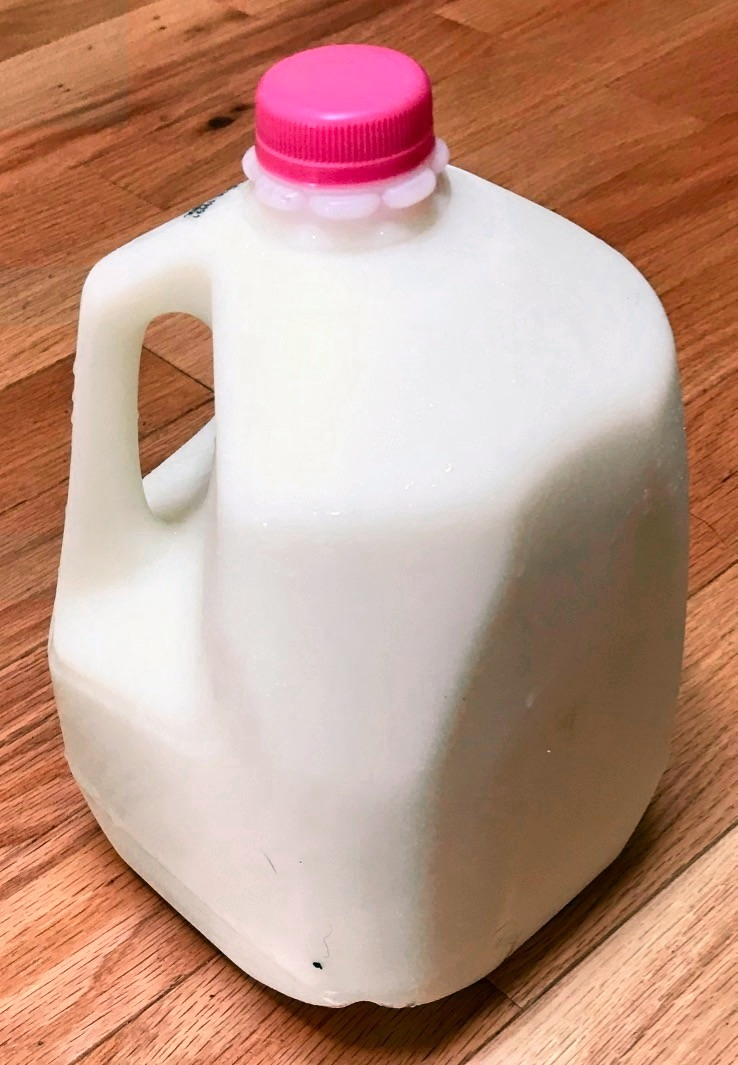
Plastic bottle of milk. One US gallon (3.78 litres)

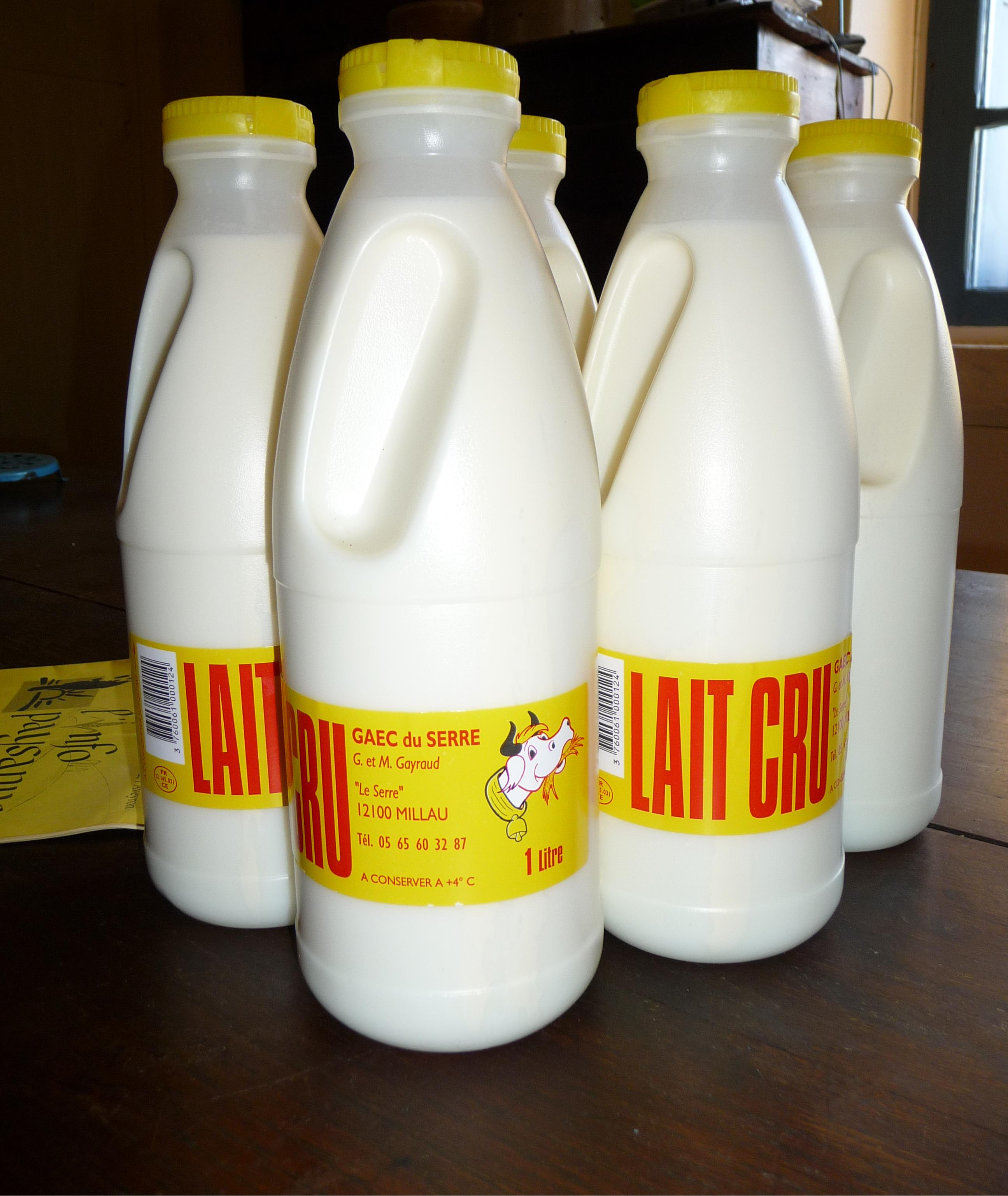
Plastic bottles with indentations for handles

Plastic milk containers are plastic containers for storing, shipping and dispensing milk. Plastic bottles, sometimes called jugs, have largely replaced glass bottles for home consumption. Glass milk bottles have traditionally been reusable, while light-weight plastic bottles are designed for single trips and plastic recycling.

== Materials ==
Packaging of milk is regulated by regional authorities. Use of food contact materials is required: potential food contamination is prohibited. Strict standards of cleanliness and processing must be followed.

The most common material in milk packaging is high density polyethylene (HDPE), recycling code 2. Low density polyethylene (LDPE) and polyester (PET) are also in use. Polycarbonate had been considered but had concerns about potential contamination with bisphenol A.

== Container forms ==
Blow molded plastic milk bottles have been in use since the 1960s. HDPE is the primary material, but polyester is also used. A wide variety of milk bottle designs are available. Some have a round cross section while others have a more square or rectangular shape. A special flat-top square milk jug was recently developed to maximize shipping and storing efficiency but had some difficulties in dispensing. Many milk bottles have integral handles.

Milk bags are also in use. The milk is sold in a plastic bag and put into a pitcher for use. Larger bags are the inner bladder of a bag-in-box, sometimes used for institutional dispensing.

Small individual containers of milk and cream are often thermoformed or injection molded and have a peelable lid. These are often used in restaurants.

== Shelf life ==
The shelf life of pasteurized milk in HDPE bottles and LDPE pouches has been determined to be between 10 and 21 days when stored at 4–8 °C (39–46 °F). Other factors such as light and temperature abuse have effects. Shelf life can be extended by ultrapasteurisation and aseptic processing.

== Volume control ==
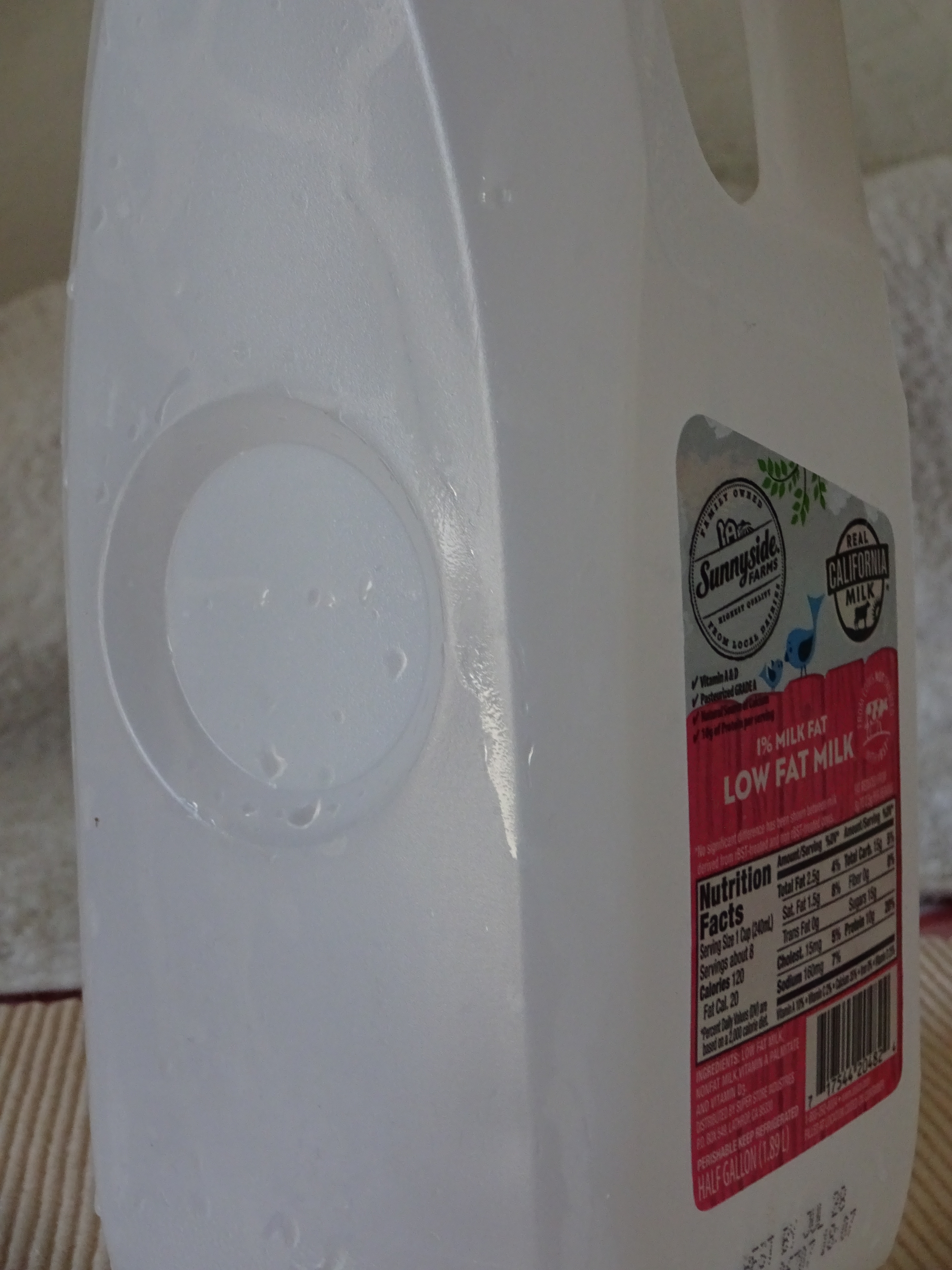
The indentation on the left side of a milk bottle adjusts the volume of the bottle.

Milk containers for retail sale must contain the same amount of milk as indicated on the label. To be acceptable to consumers, the containers must also appear to be completely full. Therefore, the volume of the container must be precisely controlled.

The designer of a die for a blow moulded bottle can never be completely sure of how much the finished bottle will hold. Shrinkage always occurs after the item is released from the mould. The amount of shrinkage depends upon many factors, including cycle time, inflation air pressure, time in storage prior to filling, storage temperature, and more.

A volume adjuster insert is one way to slightly adjust the volume of a bottle, without building a completely new mould. A volume insert attaches to the inside of a mould, creating a circular indentation on the side of the finished bottle. Different size inserts can be used as manufacturing circumstances change, for example mould temperature or cooling rate. The volume of finished bottles is periodically measured, and volume inserts are changed as needed.

== Environmental comparisons ==
Many potential factors are involved in environmental comparisons of returnable vs non-returnable systems. Researchers have often used life cycle analysis methodologies to balance the many diverse considerations. Often the comparisons show benefits and problems with all alternatives. One recent life cycle study of one-way recyclable HDPE bottles indicated the importance of secondary packaging: returnable plastic crates can allow lower tare weight bottles.

Reuse of bottles requires a reverse logistics system, cleaning and sanitizing bottles, and an effective quality management system. A key factor with glass milk bottles is the number of cycles of uses to be expected. Breakage, contamination, or other loss reduces the benefits of returnables. A key factor with one-way recyclables is the recycling rate: In the US, only about 30–35% of HDPE bottles are recycled.

== Examples ==
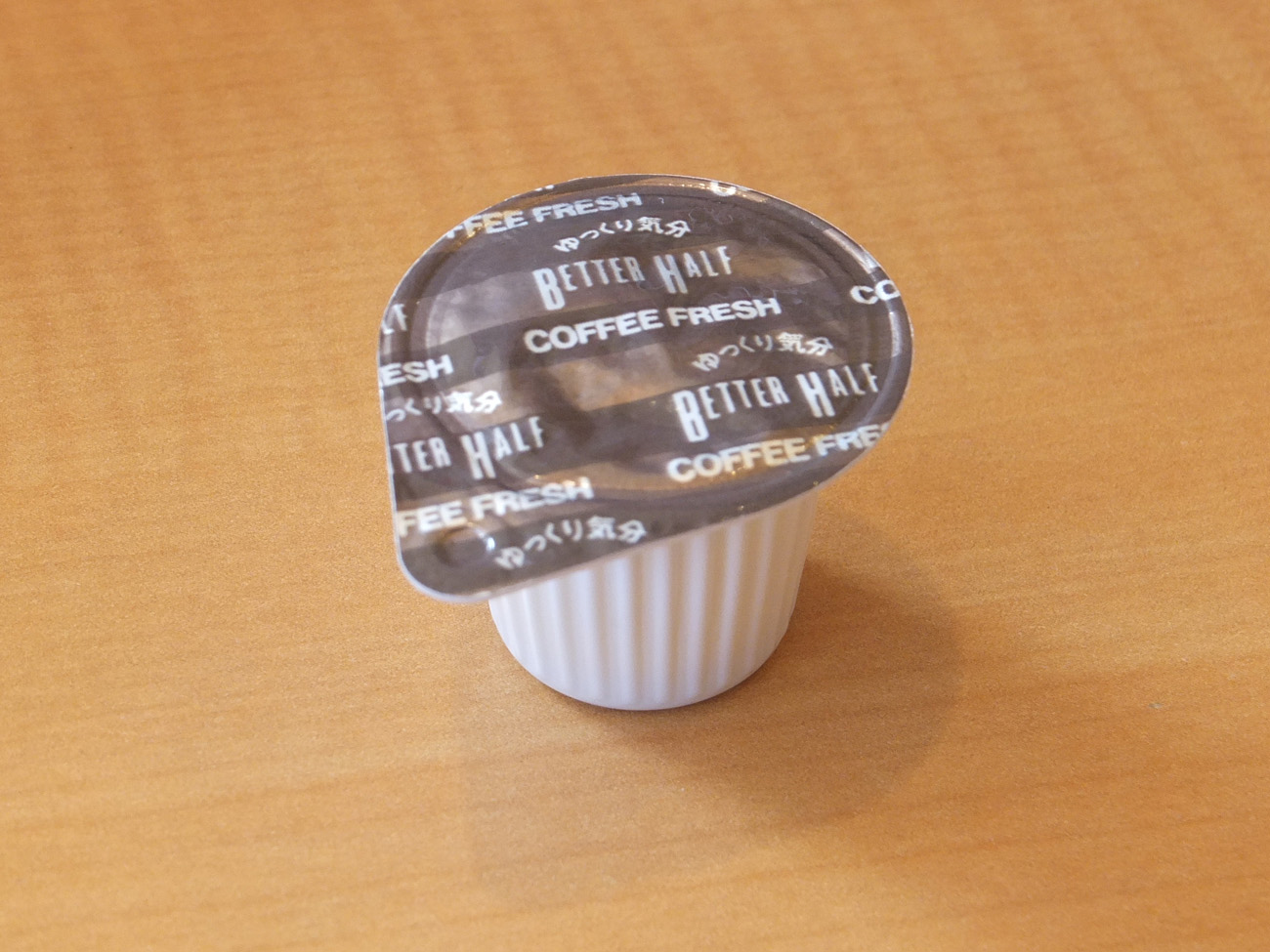
Individual plastic container of coffee creamer, Japan

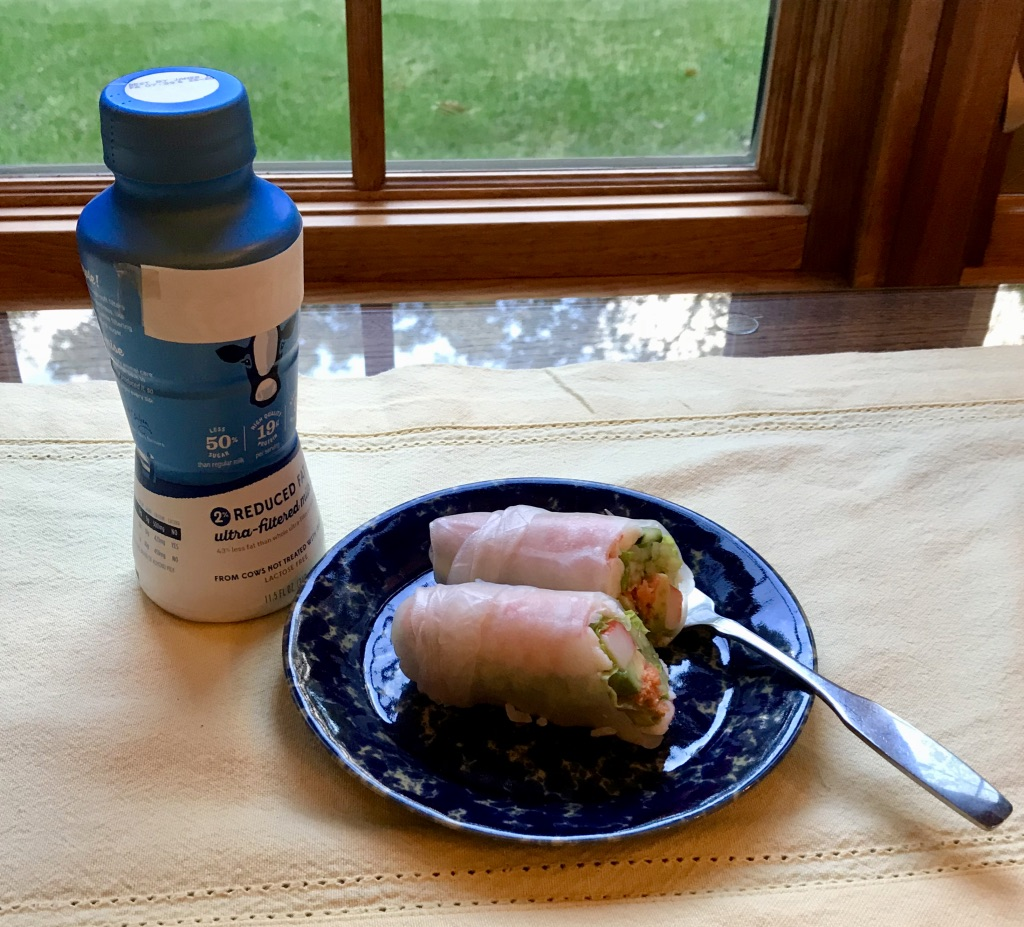
11.5 US fl oz, 340 ml, PETE bottle

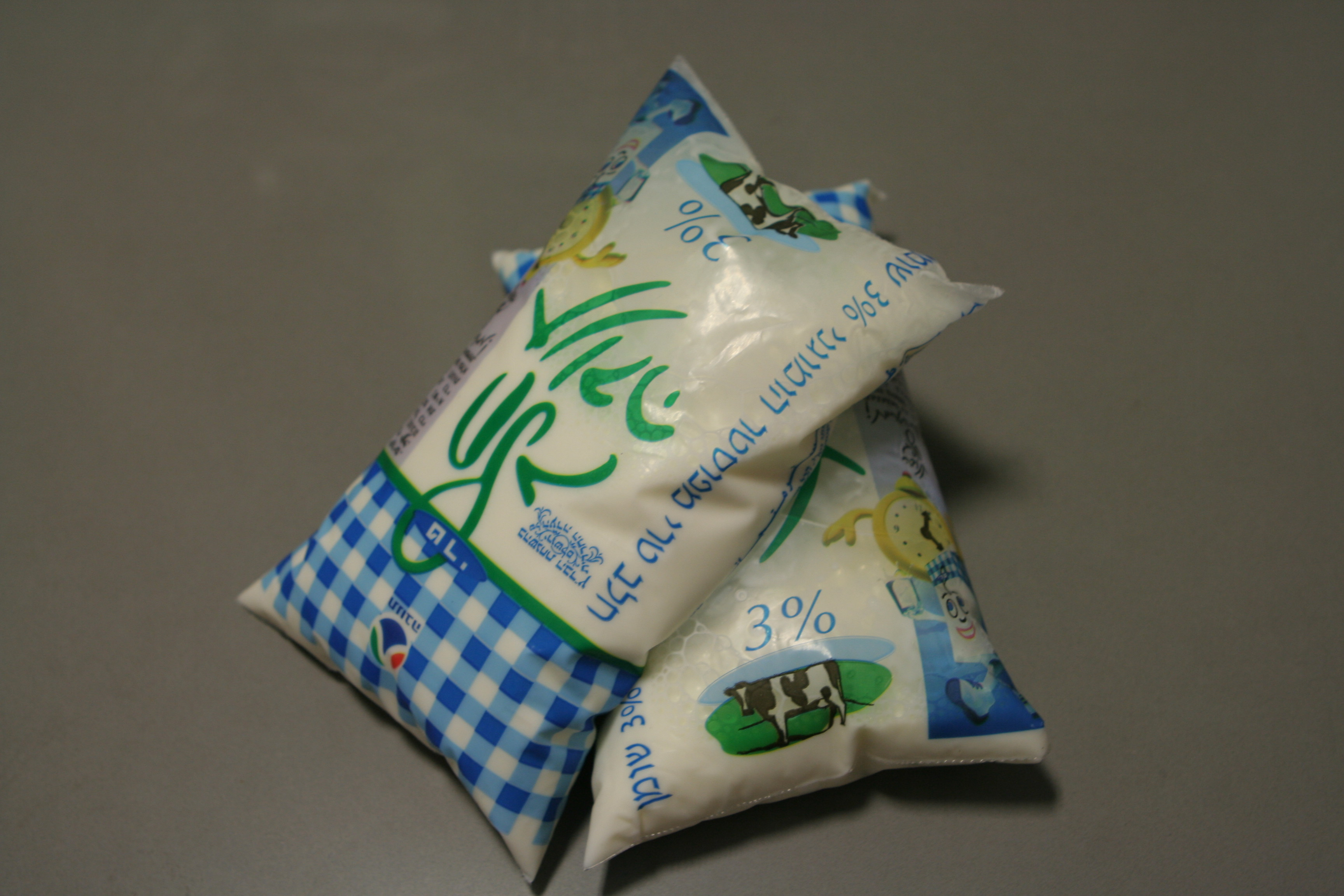
Plastic bags of milk

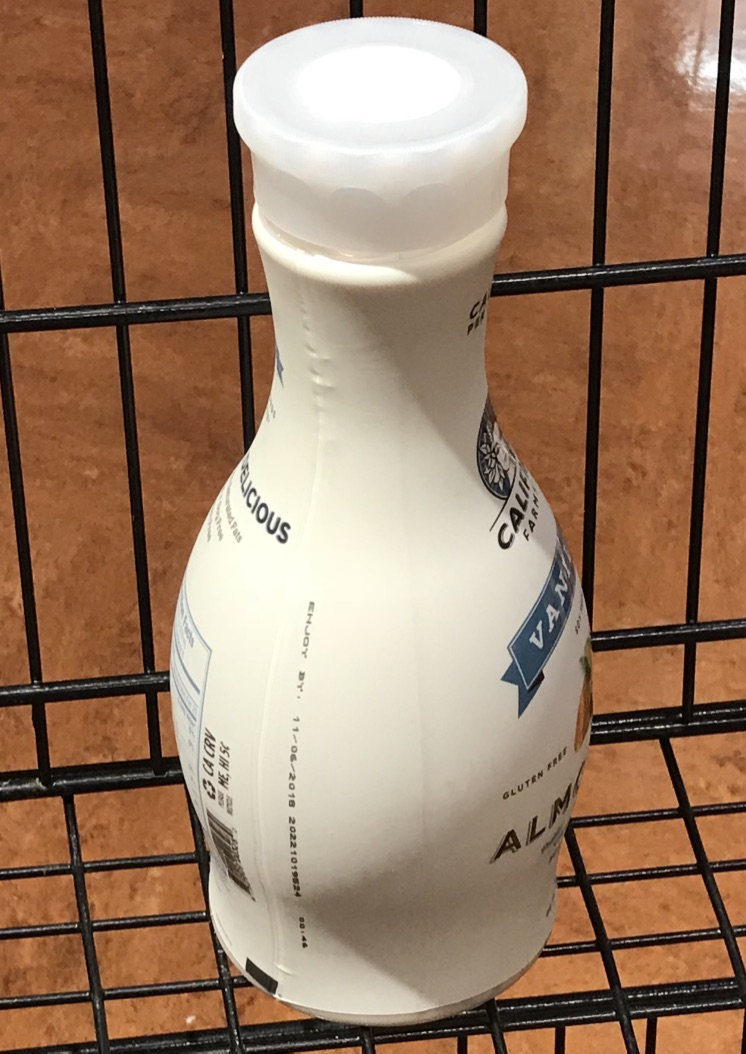
1419 ml, 48 US fl oz PETE bottle

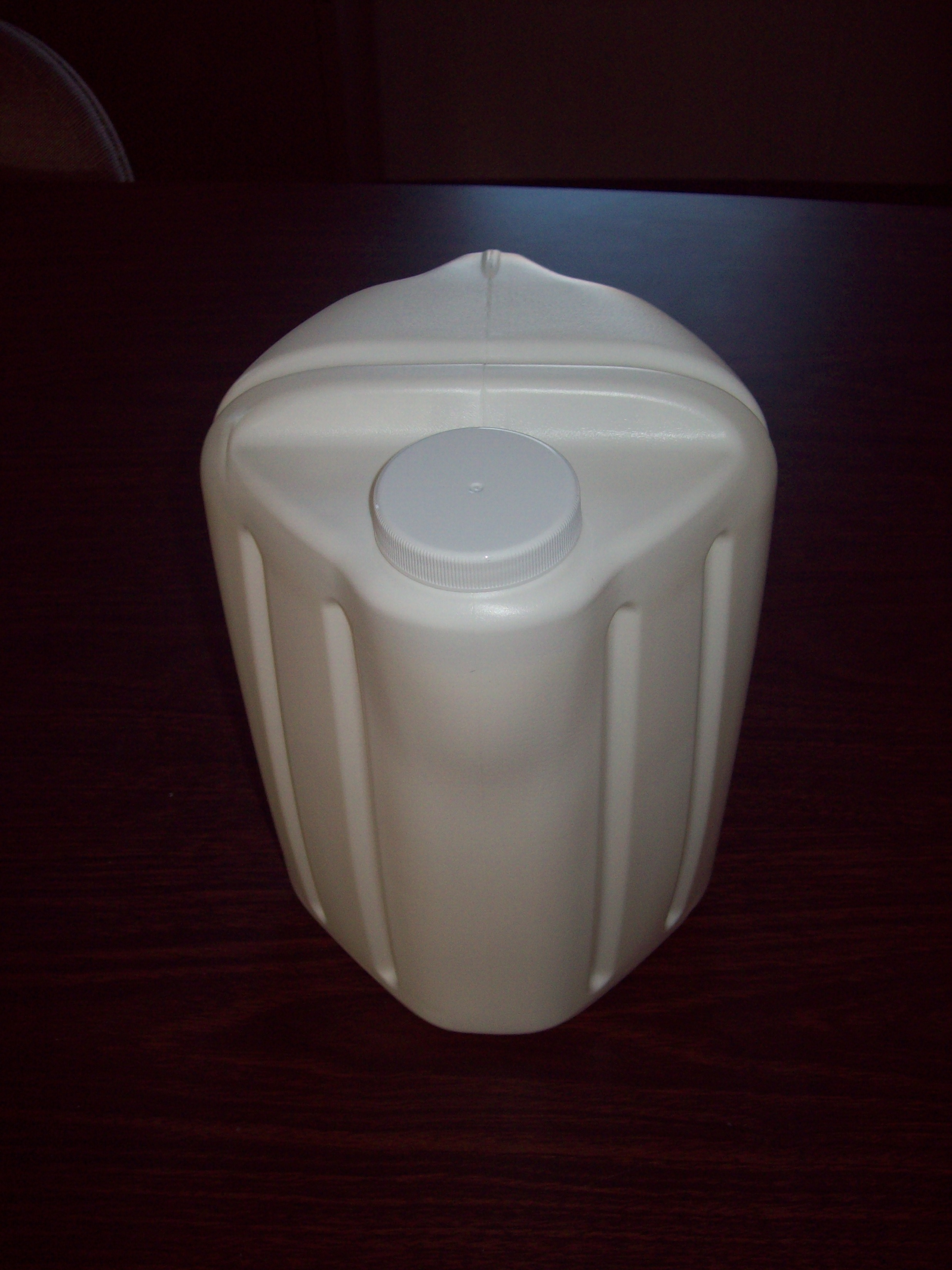
Flat-top square jug

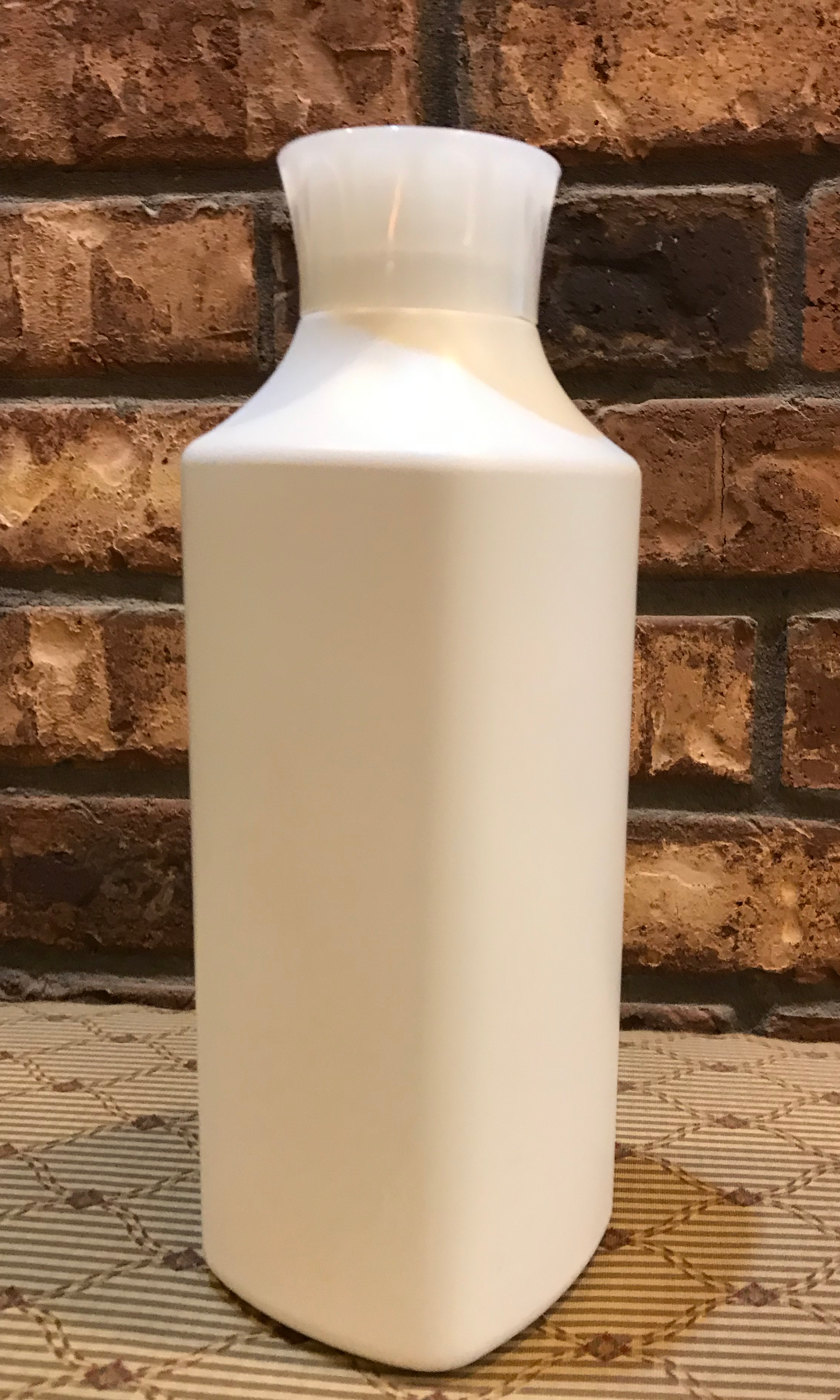
HDPE milk bottle, 40 US fl oz, 1 1/4 US quart (1183 ml)

== See also ==
- Bagged milk
- Gallon smashing, internet challenge involving participants deliberately spilling milk in a supermarket by breaking containers
- Tea set, which includes a small jug for milk or cream
