= Trashy Bags =

Ghanaian company

Trashy Bags Africa
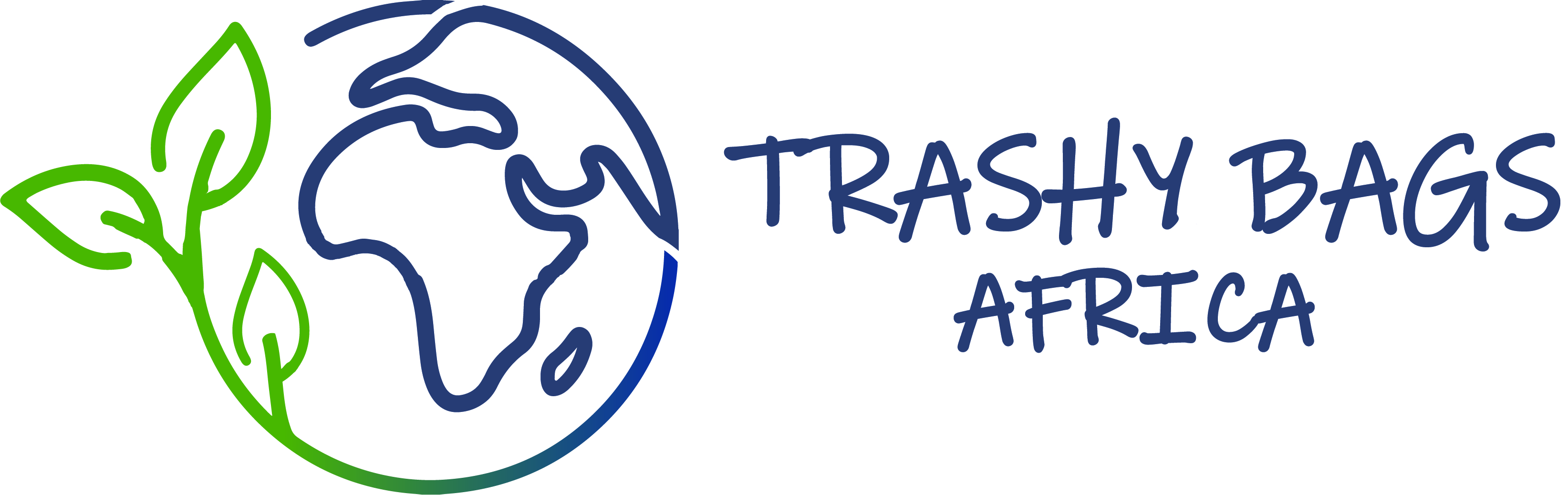

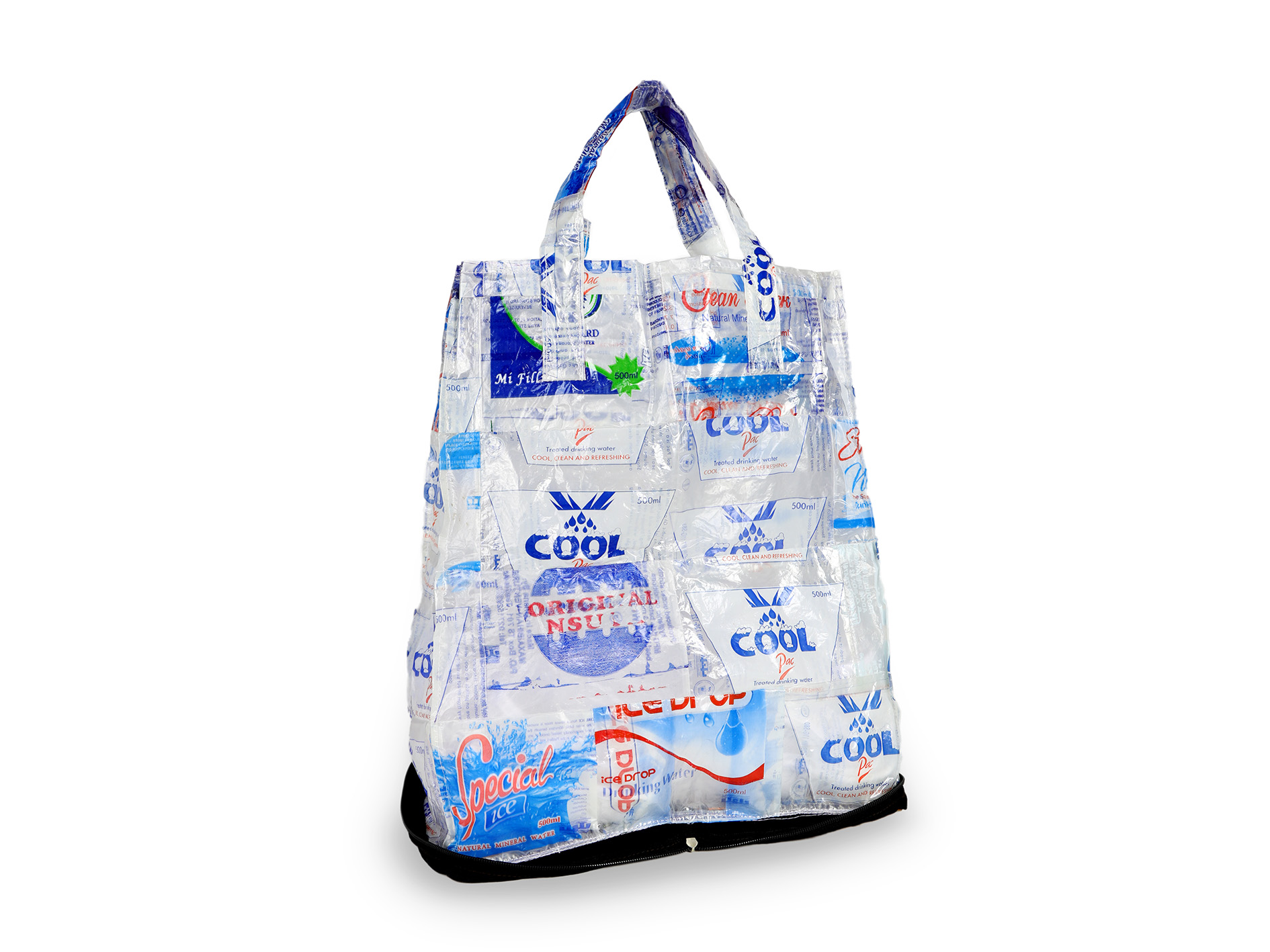
- Founded: 2007
- Headquarters: Accra, Ghana, West Africa
- Number of employees: about 40 (November 2021)
- Website: trashybagsafrica.com

Trashy Bags Africa is a commercial venture in Accra, Ghana, which turns plastic waste into reusable shopping bags, fashion accessories, school supplies, and other products.

The company employs about forty Ghanaian workers to collect, clean and stitch plastic trash in the form of sachets that contained water and other beverages. The packages often (Andrady & Neal 2009; Thompson et al. 2009a) become litter because local recycling initiatives and waste management infrastructure are insufficient.

In Ghana, drinking water (also known as Pure Water), yoghurt and juices are sold in small plastic bags called sachets. This form of packaging was introduced in Ghana in 2004 to provide safe drinking water. The sachets can be opened easily in the corners to drink from, but after use the package is discarded and will usually end up as litter or in informal trash heaps.

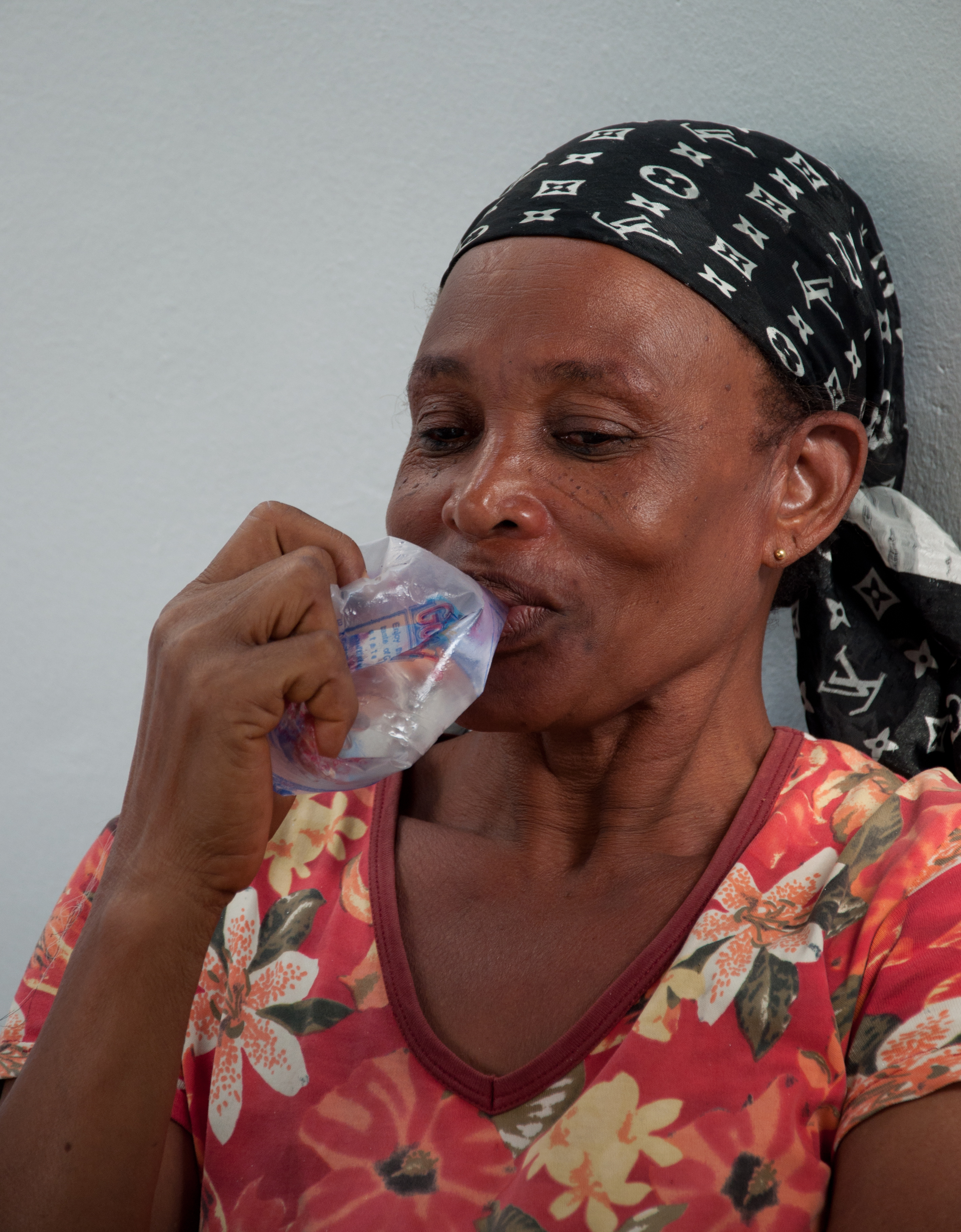
A woman drinking a plastic water sachet

The company has reprocessed approximately 30 million sachets since its founding. Every month about 200,000 plastic sachets are collected and brought to Trashy Bags Africa by a network of collectors employed by Trashy Bags. Its products are sold locally, sold online, and exported to other countries.

== History ==
Local artist Tei Huagie, who makes art out of trash, made the first bag out of plastic sachets. Stuart Gold, a British architect and entrepreneur, together with his local business partner Jane Cordie, started the Trashy Bags company in 2007. Initially, there was a factory in Madina and a showroom in Accra, but after a year these were replaced by a combined factory and showroom in the Dzorwulu neighborhood of Accra. Trashy Bags was acquired by Aqua Africa in 2021, rebranding it to Trashy Bags Africa.

== Production process ==
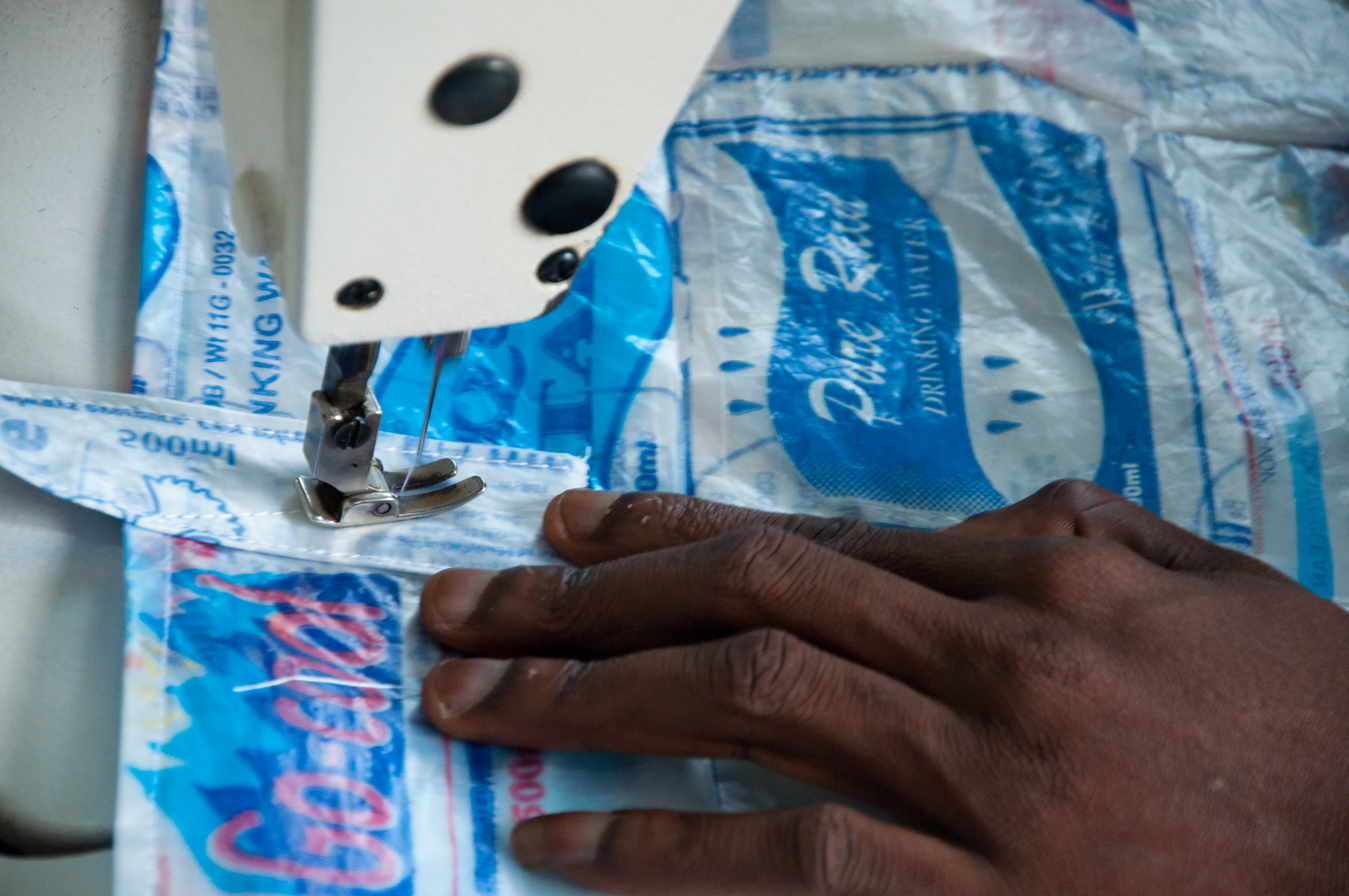
Sachets are stitched together in a process similar to the way normal fabric products are made.

Regular collectors gather sachets (mainly water sachets and products made by Fan Milk Limited) from the streets of Accra and bring them to the factory, where they are weighed and bought at a fixed rate. The sachets are sorted and are cut along one edge so the inside can be cleaned. After cleaning, they are dried in the sun. They are sewn together into sheets, which are in turn sewn together to make bags. After fittings are attached, bags are inspected and sent to the showroom on the first floor of the building.

== Products ==
The company makes various products, including laptop bags, messenger bags, tote bags, backpacks, purses, hats, wallets, and reusable shopping bags.

== See also ==
- Trashion
- Upcycling
- Waste hierarchy
- TerraCycle
