= HDPE piping in nuclear power plant systems =

Safety systems in the United States

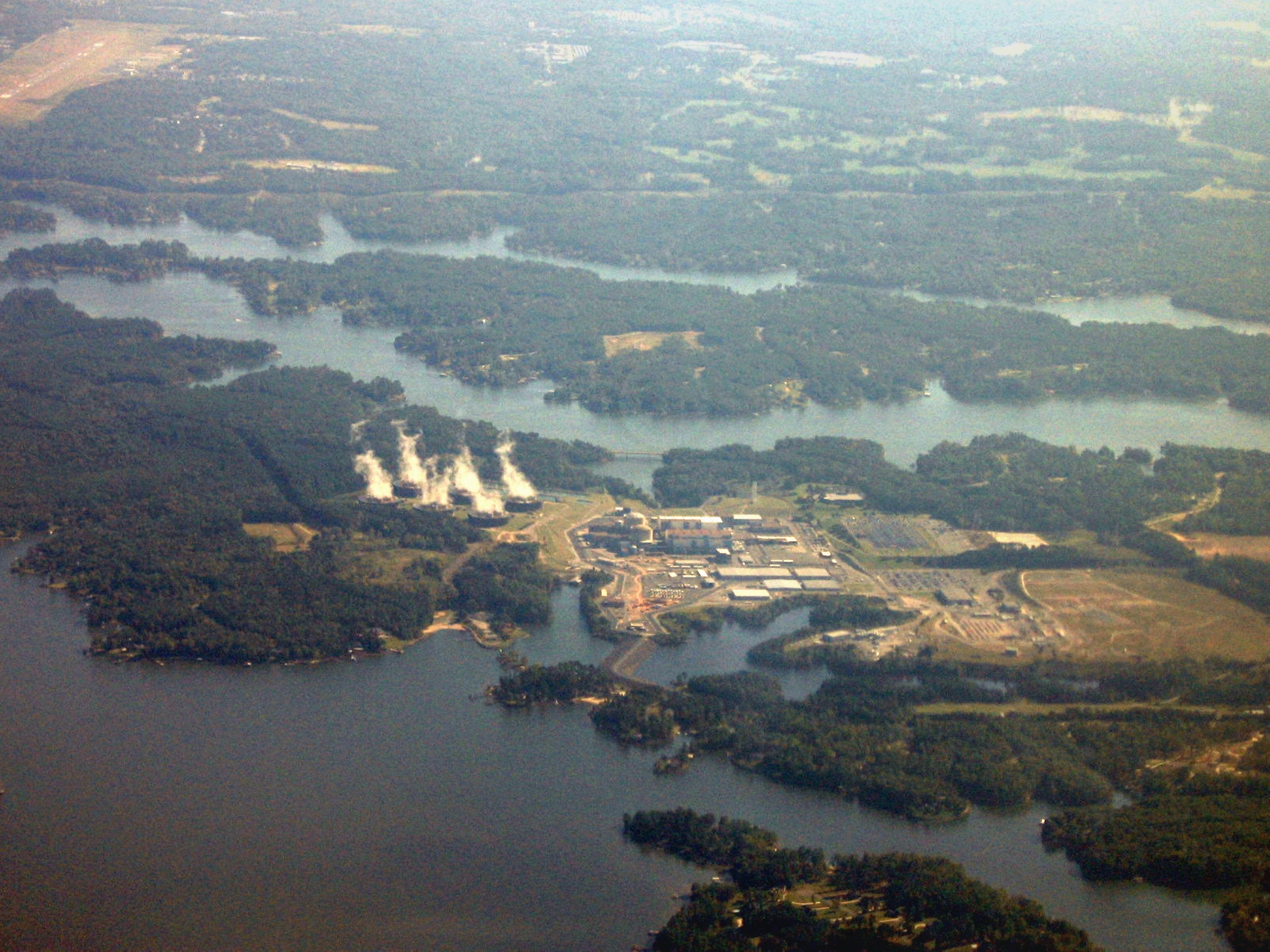
Catawba Nuclear Station

Piping systems in U.S. nuclear power plants that are relied on for the safe shutdown of the plant (i.e. “safety-related”) are typically constructed to Section III of the American Society of Mechanical Engineers (ASME) Boiler and Pressure Vessel (B&PV) Code. The materials allowed by the ASME B&PV Code have been historically limited to metallic materials only. Due to the success of high density polyethylene (HDPE) in other industries, nuclear power plants in the U.S. have expressed interest in using HDPE piping in ASME B&PV Code applications. In 2008, the first U.S. nuclear power plant was approved by the United States Nuclear Regulatory Commission (U.S. NRC) to install HDPE in an ASME B&PV Code safety-related system. Since then, the rules for using HDPE have been integrated into the 2015 Edition and 2017 Edition of the ASME B&PV Code. The NRC approved of the 2015 and 2017 Editions in 2020.

== History ==
- 1963 – Section III of the ASME B&PV Code created and only allows metallic materials.
- 2007 – Code Case N-755 issued on behalf of Duke Energy for the use of Polyethylene Plastic Pipe for Class 3 piping applications. Code Case N-755 limits HDPE fusing to butt fusion.
- 2008 – U.S. NRC grants Callaway Plant, Unit 1, permission to use HDPE in the Essential Service Water System based on Code Case N-755 and additional plant specific information.
- 2009 – U.S. NRC grants Catawba Nuclear Station, Units 1 and 2, permission to use HDPE in the Nuclear Service Water System based on Code Case N-755 and additional plant specific information.
- 2010 – First Revision to Code Case N-755 issued.
- 2013 – Second Revision to Code Case N-755 issued.
- 2014 – U.S. NRC rejects Code Case N-755-0 (Revision 0) for generic use due to unresolved issues concerning the joining procedure, degradation processes, and examination of joints.
- 2015 – U.S. NRC grants Edwin I. Hatch Nuclear Plant, Unit 2, permission to use HDPE in the Plant Service Water System.
- 2015 –The use of Polyethylene Plastic Pipe for Class 3 applications is incorporated into Mandatory Appendix XXVI of ASME Section III.
- 2017 – U.S. NRC rejects Code Case N-755-1 for generic use due to ongoing unresolved issues.
- 2020 - U.S. NRC approves 2015 Edition of ASME B&PV Code which includes the use of HDPE piping for Class 3 applications.

== ASME boiler & pressure vessel code sections for HDPE ==
ASME B&PV Code Section III – Rules for Construction of Nuclear Facility Components

- Appendix XXVI – Rules for Construction of Class 3 Buried Polyethylene Pressure Piping
  - Article XXVI-1000: General Requirements
  - Article XXVI-2000: Materials
  - Article XXVI-3000: Design
  - Article XXVI-4000: Fabrication and Installation
  - Article XXVI-5000: Examination
  - Article XXVI-6000: Testing
  - Article XXVI-7000: Overpressure Protection
  - Article XXVI-8000: Nameplates, Stamping, and Reports
  - Article XXVI-9000: Glossary
  - Mandatory Supplements I – III
  - Non-mandatory Supplements A - D

ASME B&PV Code Section IX – Welding, Brazing, and Fusing Qualifications

- Part QF – Plastic Fusing
  - Article XXI – Plastic Fusing General Requirements
  - Article XXII – Fusing Procedure Qualifications

== Application ==
The use of HDPE in U.S. nuclear power plants is currently limited to PE4710 material since this was the material first identified in Code Case N-755 and approved by the U.S. NRC. Code Case N-755 and the 2015 Edition of ASME B&PV Code, Section III, Appendix XXVI are limited to butt fusion (i.e. hot plate welding) only. Electrofusion is included in the 2017 Edition of the ASME B&PV Code, Section III, Appendix XXVI. Both N-755 and Appendix XXVI limit the use of HDPE to Class 3 piping systems.

== Required examination and testing ==
All welds made with either hot plate welding or electrofusion welding are required to be visually inspected and have a hydrostatic pressure test. All joints in pipe 4 inches and large must have 100% volumetric non-destructive examination (NDE) performed. The volumetric NDE may be either ultrasonic examination or microwave examination.

== Benefits ==
The steel piping used in service water systems at nuclear power plants are often subjected to various forms of degradation including general corrosion, microbiological induced corrosion, tuberculation, and galvanic corrosion. HDPE is typically impervious to these forms of degradation. Additionally, nuclear power plants typically have robust seismic requirements and HDPE is very flexible which increases its ability to survive an earthquake.

== Challenges ==
The use of HDPE in nuclear power plants requires extensive qualification and testing efforts to demonstrate that the material is safe under all design basis conditions. The U.S. NRC has raised concerns in the past with the use of HDPE related to butt fusion joint integrity, the ability to detect flaws in joints, and the potential for slow crack growth. This has prevented the NRC from generically approving the use of HDPE. Nuclear Power plants can still request approval from the U.S. NRC on a case-by-case basis (i.e., relief request).

== Current status of U.S. NRC approval ==
The NRC has reviewed the 2015 and 2017 Editions of the ASME B&PV Code which have been accepted and incorporation into 10CFR50.55a with the following conditions related to the use of HDPE:

Section III condition: Mandatory Appendix XXVI. When applying the 2015 and 2017 Editions of Section III, Mandatory Appendix XXVI, "Rules for Construction of Class 3 Buried Polyethylene Pressure Piping," applicants or licensees must meet the following conditions:
(A) Mandatory Appendix XXVI: First provision. When performing fusing procedure qualification testing in accordance with XXVI–2300 and XXVI–4330 the following essential variables must be used for the performance qualification tests of butt fusion joints:
(1)	Joint Type: A change in the type of joint from that qualified, except that a square butt joint qualifies as a mitered joint.
(2)	Pipe Surface Alignment: A change in the pipe outside diameter (O.D.) surface misalignment of more than 10 percent of the wall thickness of the thinner member to be fused.
(3)	PE Material: Each lot of polyethylene source material to be used in production (XXVI–2310(c)).
(4)	Wall Thickness: Each thickness to be fused in production (XXVI–2310(c)).
(5)	Diameter: Each diameter to be fused in production (XXVI–2310(c)).
(6)	Cross-sectional Area: Each combination of thickness and diameter (XXVI–2310(c)).
(7)	Position: Maximum machine carriage slope when greater than 20 degrees from horizontal (XXVI–4321(c)).
(8)	Heater Surface Temperature: A change in the heater surface temperature to a value beyond the range tested (XXVI–2321).
(9)	Ambient Temperature: A change in ambient temperature to less than 50 °F (10 °C) or greater than 125 °F (52 °C) (XXVI–4412(b)).
(10)	Interfacial Pressure: A change in interfacial pressure to a value beyond the range tested (XXVI–2321).
(11)	Decrease in Melt Bead Width: A decrease in melt bead size from that qualified.
(12)	Increase in Heater Removal Time: An increase in heater plate removal time from that qualified.
(13)	Decrease in Cool-down Time: A decrease in the cooling time at pressure from that qualified.
(14)	Fusing Machine Carriage Model: A change in the fusing machine carriage model from that tested (XXVI–2310(d)).
(B) Mandatory Appendix XXVI: Second provision. When performing procedure qualification for high speed tensile impact testing of butt fusion joints in accordance with XXVI–2300 or XXVI–4330, breaks in the specimen that are away from the fusion zone must be retested. When performing fusing operator qualification bend tests of butt fusion joints in accordance with XXVI–4342, guided side bend testing must be used for all thicknesses greater than 1.25 inches.
(C) Mandatory Appendix XXVI: Third provision. When performing fusing procedure qualification tests in accordance with 2017 Edition of BPV Code Section III XXVI–2300 and XXVI–4330, the following essential variables must be used for the testing of electrofusion joints:
(1)	Joint Design: A change in the design of an electrofusion joint.
(2)	Fit-up Gap: An increase in the maximum radial fit-up gap qualified.
(3)	Pipe PE Material: A change in the PE designation or cell classification of the pipe from that tested (XXVI–2322(a)).
(4)	Fitting PE Material: A change in the manufacturing facility or production lot from that tested (XXVI–2322(b)).
(5)	Pipe Wall Thickness: Each thickness to be fused in production (XXVI–2310(c)).
(6)	Fitting Manufacturer: A change in fitting manufacturer.
(7)	Pipe Diameter: Each diameter to be fused in production (XXVI–2310(c)).
(8)	Cool-down Time: A decrease in the cool time at pressure from that qualified.
(9)	Fusion Voltage: A change in fusion voltage.
(10)	Nominal Fusion Time: A change in the nominal fusion time.
(11)	Material Temperature Range: A change in material fusing temperature beyond the range qualified.
(12)	Power Supply: A change in the make or model of electrofusion control box (XXVI–2310(f)).
(13)	Power Cord: A change in power cord material, length, or diameter that reduces current at the coil to below the minimum qualified.
(14)	Processor: A change in the manufacturer or model number of the processor. (XXVI–2310(f)).
(15)	Saddle Clamp: A change in the type of saddle clamp.
(16)	Scraping Device: A change from a clean peeling scraping tool to any other type of tool.
