= HDT =

HDT may refer to:

- HDT (data format), a data compression format
- Hardware Detection Tool, software for SYSLINUX
- Hawaii–Aleutian Daylight Time
- Heat deflection temperature, at which a polymer deforms under load
- High Data Throughput, a transmission mode introduced in Bluetooth 7
- Holden Dealer Team, a former car-racing team
- Henry David Thoreau, American transcendentalist poet
- Heavy Duty Truck (HDT), a class 7 or 8 prime mover, the term is usually used in the fifth wheel rv industry
