= Barrier pipe =

Water pipe with a barrier against contaminants

A barrier pipe is a type of water pipe with a barrier to prevent undesired contaminants from entering the pipe.

== Water supply ==
When running water supply pipes through contaminated ground standard MDPE piping is unsuitable because it doesn't block entry of contaminants such as hydrocarbons. Barrier piping typically has an aluminium layer between two plastic layers but solid cast iron and other options exist. It's normally required for brownfield land construction.

== Heating systems ==
In hydronic, water-carrying, heating systems a plastic pipe is manufactured with a barrier that prevents oxygen from penetrating the material and entering the water system, reducing the risk of corrosion. The 'barrier' is usually a resin material bonded between the outer and inner layer of the pipe itself. The pipe being either a cross linked polyethylene or polybutylene. This can be cheaper than the traditional copper piping.
