= HDPE pipe =

Type of flexible plastic pipe

HDPE pipe (high-density polyethylene pipe) is a type of flexible plastic pipe used to transfer fluids and gases. It is often employed for replacing aging concrete or steel main pipelines. Constructed from the thermoplastic HDPE (high-density polyethylene), it has low permeability and robust molecular bonding, making it suitable for high-pressure pipelines. HDPE pipe is often used for water mains, gas mains, sewer mains, slurry transfer lines, rural irrigation, fire-suppression system supply lines, electrical and communication conduits, and stormwater and drainage pipes.

It is frequently used in pipe bursting.

== Attributes ==
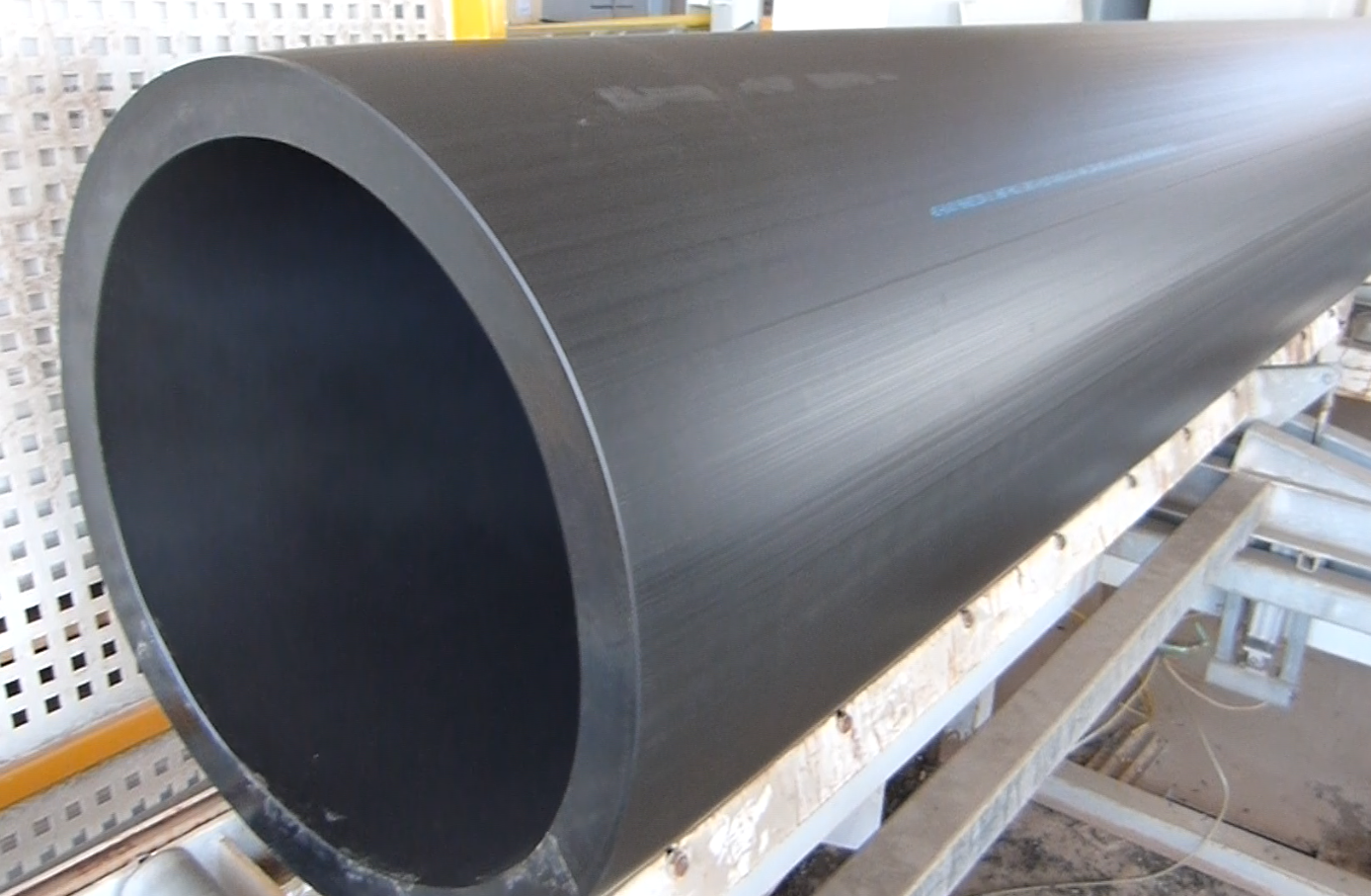
Freshly extruded HDPE Pipe

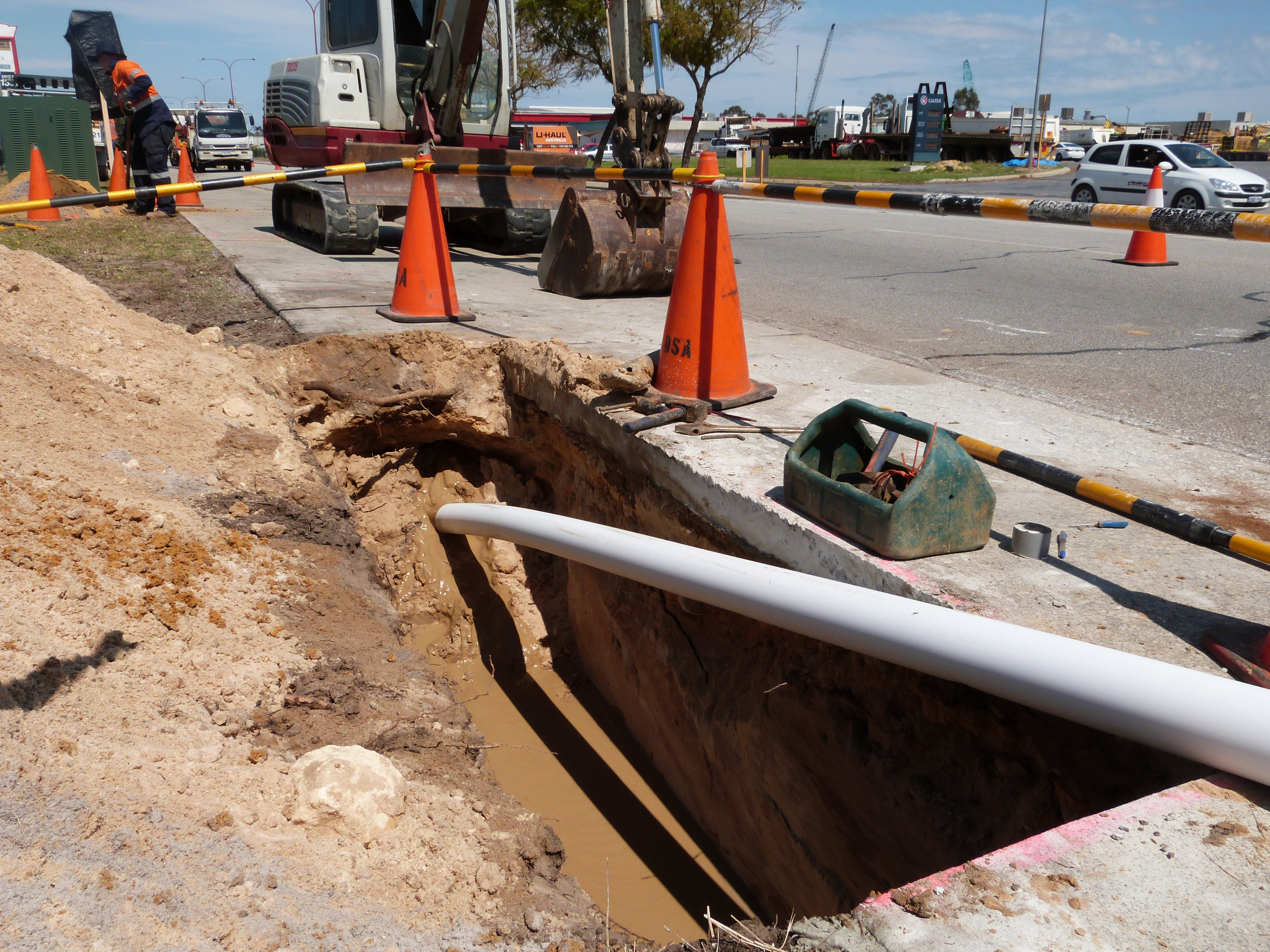
HDPE communications conduit pipe being installed by directional drilling in Perth, Western Australia

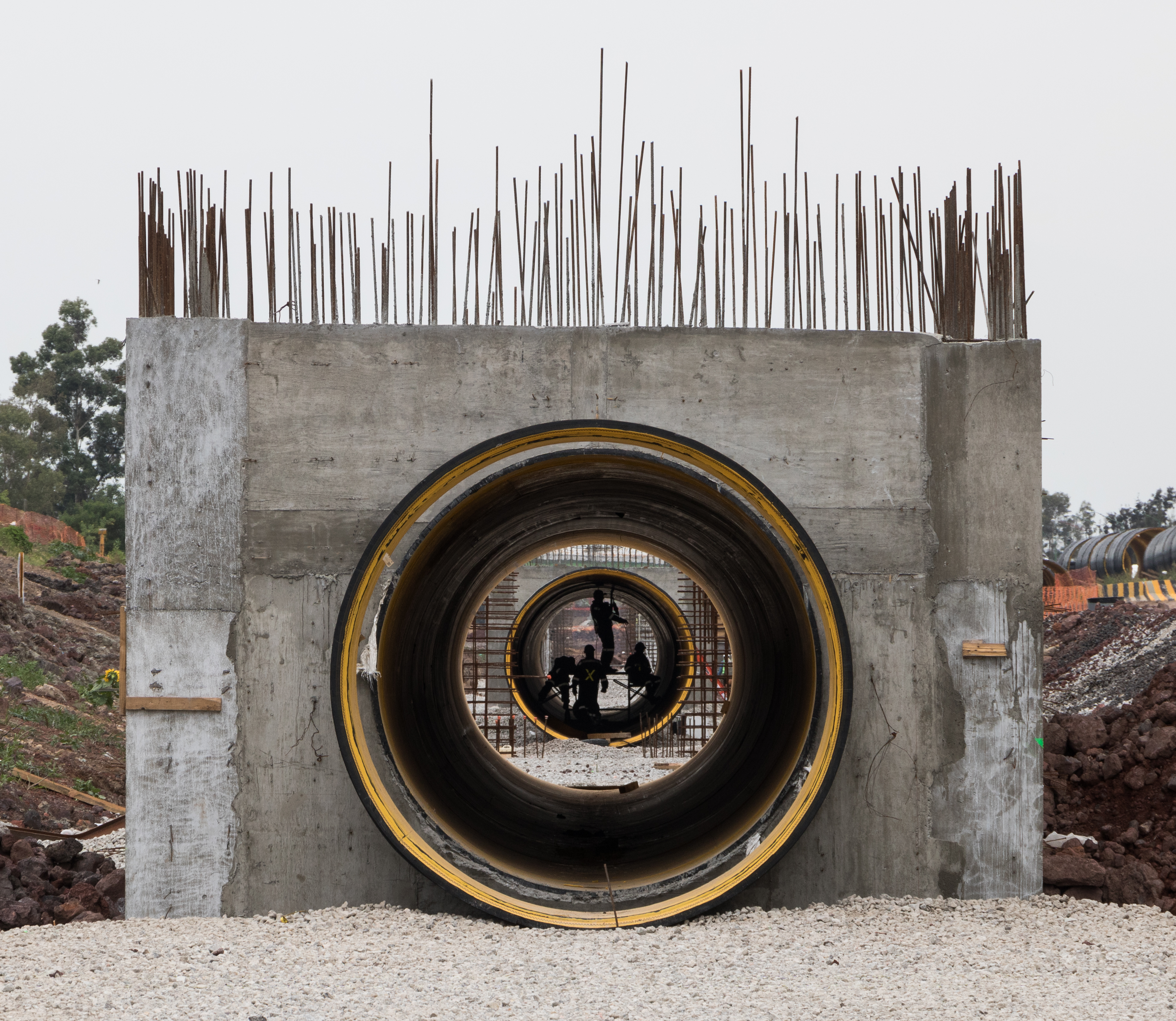
3048 mm (120 inch) HDPE pipe installation in Mexico City

HDPE is resistant to many environmental factors and has applications where cheap but durable fluid piping systems are required.

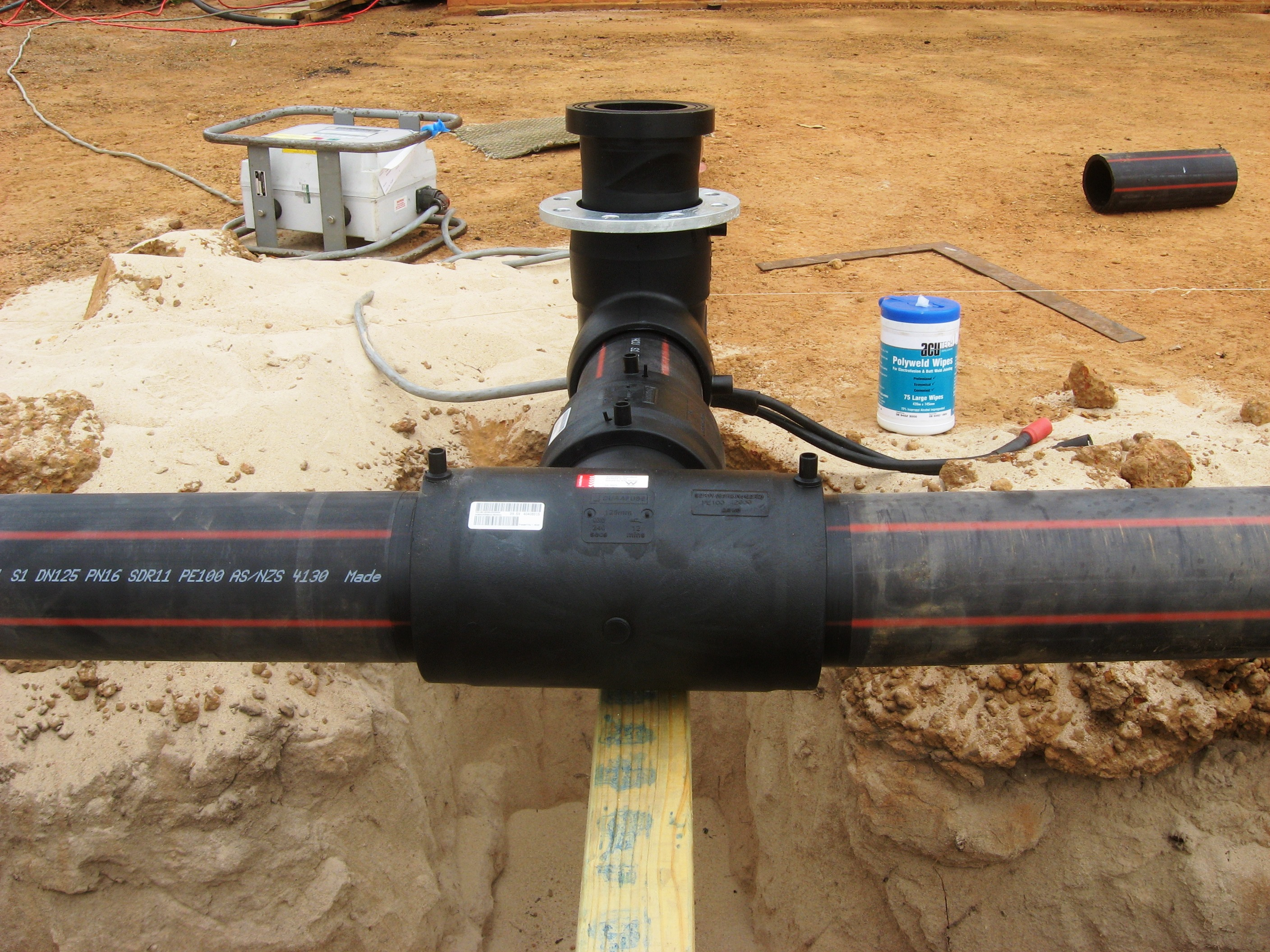
Electrofusion welding of HDPE pipe

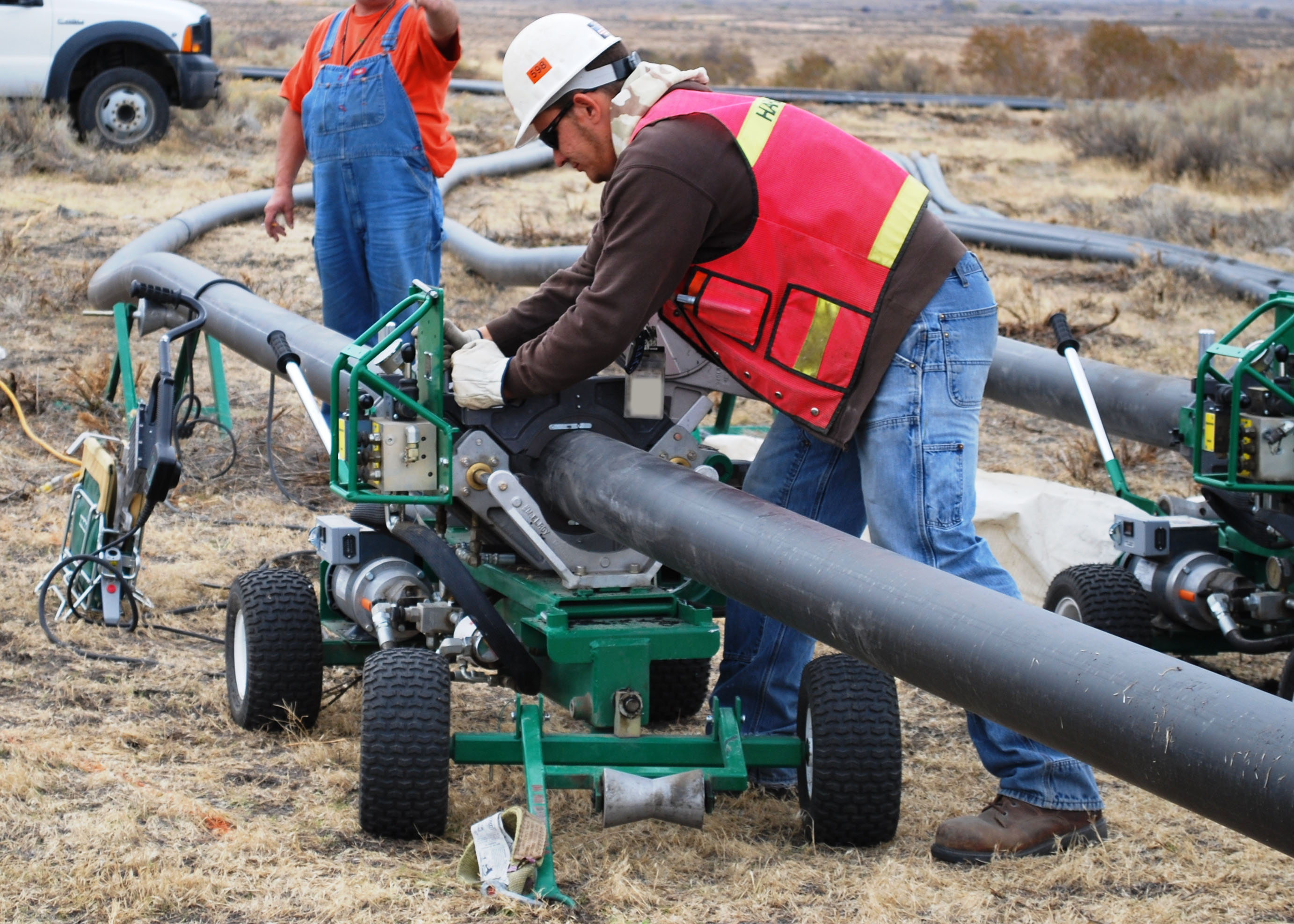
Bonding HDPE for DX Groundwater Treatment Facility at the Hanford Site

HDPE pipe can be joined by butt welding, electrofusion welding, socket welding, or extrusion welding. These joints heat the pipe during the joining process to create a completely homogeneous joint without the need for additional seals or jointing compounds, reducing the likelihood of failure or negative environmental effects. HDPE is less likely than PVC pipe to have problems with root intrusion and provides integrity for the pipeline, even when installed in unstable soils.

Due to the fusion welding system, HDPE pipe does not need any additional supports around joints. This also allows for safer excavation close to the pipeline in the future, which is particularly important for high-pressure gas pipelines. HDPE pipe is highly durable and flexible even at lower ambient temperatures, enabling bends in the pipe system to be created with relative ease. Due to its high impact resistance and flexibility, HDPE pipe is well-suited for installation in dynamic soils, including those in earthquake-prone areas. HDPE has been considered to be cost-effective due to its versatility in installation and reduced need for maintenance.

Because food-grade polyethylene virgin material is used to fabricate HDPE pipes, they are safe for the transfer of drinking water. HDPE is resistant to many chemicals, facilitating its use in process plants or in corrosive or acidic environments without use of protective coatings or galvanization. As HDPE has a lower thermal conductivity than many metals it can maintain more uniform temperatures than metal pipes when carrying fluids, which reduces the need for insulation around a pipeline.

== Manufacturing ==
To make lengths of HDPE pipe, polyethylene raw material is dried, heated to ~180 °C (356 °F), and extruded through a die.

Polyethylene pipe is usually black due to the addition of 3-5% of carbon black to the clear polyethylene material, which adds UV light resistance to the finished pipe. To create striped HDPE pipe a different die is used, containing small channels that the colored material runs through just before it is pushed through the die. Co-extruded, or co-ex HDPE pipe has an extra 'skin' of color around the black HDPE pipe, allowing the pipe to be colored on the outside for the identification of thermal cooling requirements.

After coming through the die the pipe is cooled by submerging in or spraying with water. The rate of cooling is carefully controlled to avoid deformation of the extruded pipe. Once cooled, a laser or powder printer prints the size, type, date, and manufacturer's name on the side of the pipe. It is then cut by a saw cutter or coiled into longer lengths on a coiler.

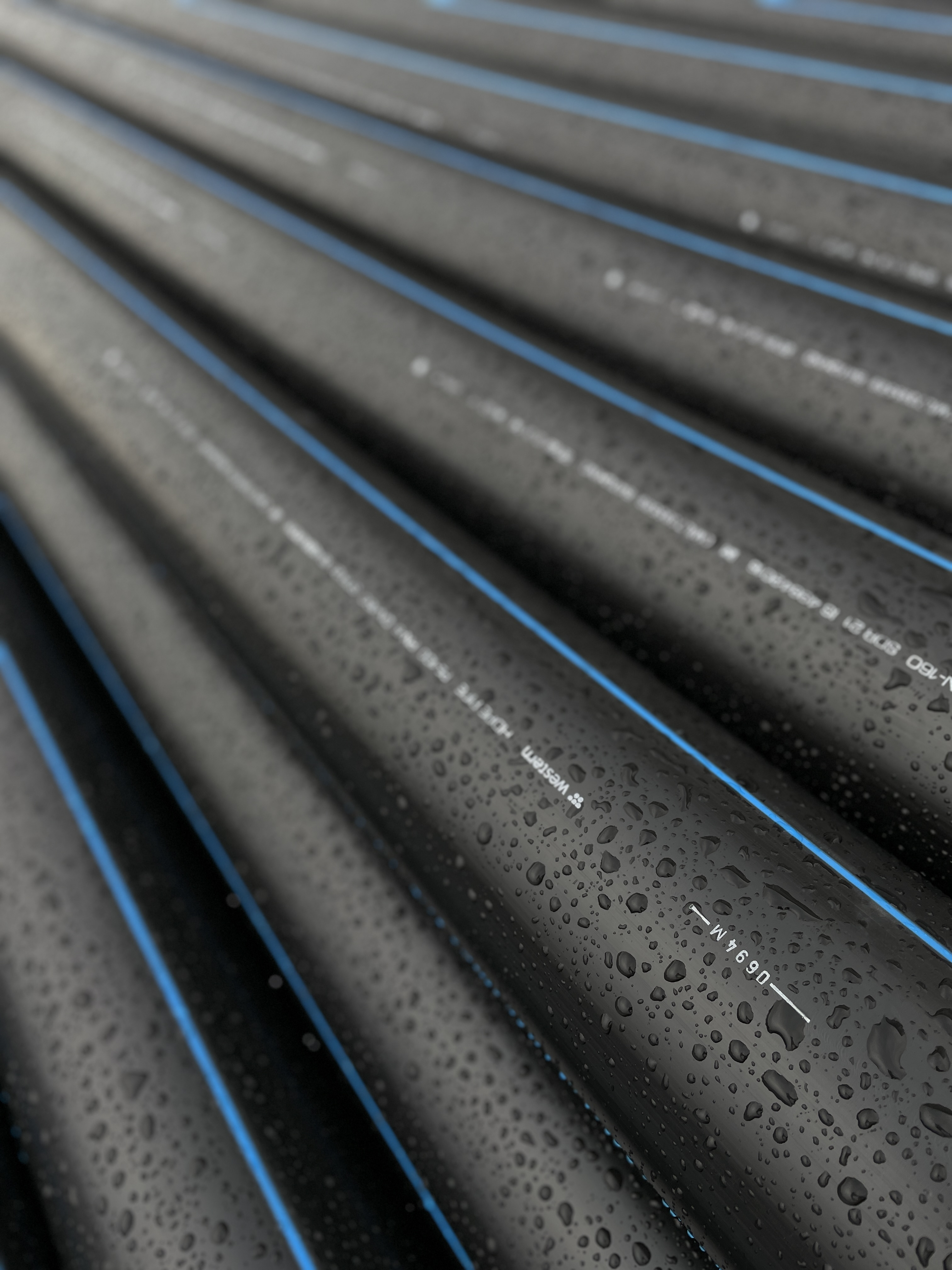
HDPE pipe with blue stripes

== Longevity ==
HDPE piping is estimated to last 50 years. However, technical white papers written by the Plastics Industry Pipe Association assert that HDPE pipe systems can be reasonably expected to last up to, or over 100 years.
