= Ring and Ball Apparatus =

Ring and Ball Apparatus is used to determine the softening point of bitumen, waxes, LDPE, HDPE/PP blend granules, rosin and solid hydrocarbon resins. The apparatus was first designed in the 1910s while ASTM adopted a test method in 1916. This instrument is ideally used for materials having softening point in the range of 30 °C to 157 °C.

== Components ==
- Two brass rings.
- Two steel balls.
- Two ball guides to hold the balls in position.
- A Support to hold the rings, balls and thermometer in position
- A Glass beaker
- Thermometer
- Hot plate
- Magnetic stirrer
- Glycerol or water as heating bath

== Procedure ==
The solid sample is taken in a Petri dish and melted by heating it on a standard hot plate. The bubble free liquefied sample is poured from the Petri dish and cast into the ring. The brass shouldered rings in this apparatus have 6.4 mm depth. The cast sample in the ring is kept undisturbed for one hour to solidify. Excess material is removed with a hot knife. The ring is set with the ball on top with ball guides on the grooved plate within the heating bath. As the temperature rises, the balls begin to sink through the rings carrying a portion of the softened sample with it. The temperature at which the steel balls touch the bottom plate determines the softening point in degrees Celsius.
