= Medium-density polyethylene =

Type of thermoplastic polymer

MDPE
Density	0.926–0.940 g/cm^{3}
Young modulus/ E modulus/ Tensile modulus	172–379 MPa
Tensile strength(σ_{t})	12.4–19.3 MPa
Elongation @ break	100–150%
Brittleness, low temperature	−118 °C
Vicat	99–124 °C
Specific heat (c)	1.916 kJ/kg.K
Source: J.Brandrup, E. H. Immergut & E.A. Grulke, Polymer Handbook Fourth edition, ISBN 0-471-48171-8

Medium-density polyethylene (MDPE) is a type of polyethylene defined by a density range of 0.926–0.940 g/cm^{3}. It is less dense than HDPE, which is more common.

MDPE can be produced by chromium/silica catalysts, Ziegler-Natta catalysts or metallocene catalysts. MDPE has good shock and drop resistance properties. It also is less notch sensitive than HDPE. Stress cracking resistance is better than that of HDPE. MDPE is typically used in gas pipes and fittings, sacks, shrink film, packaging film, carrier bags, and screw closures.

In the United Kingdom, black (or blue) MDPE is often used for water and waste water plumbing, and may also be referred to as 'black alkathene.'

== See also ==
- Cross-linked polyethylene (PEX)
- High-density polyethylene (HDPE)
- Electrofusion
- Linear low-density polyethylene (LLDPE)
- Low-density polyethylene (LDPE)
- Plastic recycling
- Stretch wrap
- Ultra-high-molecular-weight polyethylene (UHMWPE)
