= Stone paper =

Durable paper-like material made from calcium carbonate and polyethylene

Stone paper products, also referred to as bio-plastic paper, mineral paper or rich mineral paper, are strong and durable paper-like materials manufactured from calcium carbonate bonded with high-density polyethylene (HDPE) resin. They are used in many of the same applications as cellulose-based paper.

== Properties ==
Stone "paper" consists of roughly 80% calcium carbonate, 18% HDPE and 2% proprietary coating. It has a density range of 1.0–1.6 g/cm^{3} (0.58–0.92 oz/cu in), which is equal to or slightly higher than that of ordinary paper, and a texture somewhat like that of the outer membrane of a boiled egg. It is not biodegradable or compostable, but is photo-degradable by the ultraviolet (UVa) light in daylight. Thus stone "paper" does not meet archival standards and requires special measures for long-term conservation.

Because it is not made from cellulose fibers, stone paper can have a smoother surface than most traditional products, eliminating the need for additional coating or lamination. The calcium carbonate is mined from quarries or precipitated from limestone. The production of stone paper uses no acid, bleach or optical brighteners. It can be recycled into new stone paper, but only if recycled separately at dedicated civic amenity sites or other recycling/waste processing points.

Stone paper products are compatible with inkjet or solid ink printers (e.g., offset, letterpress, gravure, flexographic) but do not respond well to very high temperature laser printers.

== Sustainability ==
Comparisons have been made between stone paper and traditional paper for applications like book printing in Europe. If stone paper replaced coated and uncoated graphic printing stock in Europe, it could potentially reduce CO_{2} emissions by 25% to 62%, water consumption by 89% to 99.2%, and wood usage by 100% compared to current European consumption, which is mostly of virgin paper. The environmental benefits of stone paper relative to recycled paper are much less substantial.

While there are carbon benefits to stone paper relative to conventional paper, stone paper has suffered accusations of greenwashing owing to the incorporation of HDPE in its production. Stone paper poses difficulties for the recycling process, because its similarities with conventional paper can lead to consumers incorrectly placing it with conventional paper recycling. HDPE has been presented as degradable in marketing materials; while HDPE does break down when exposed to direct sunlight, it does so into microplastics rather than alternative chemicals as suggested by positive marketing framing. Claims of carbon benefits have been criticized for the premise that the primary component, calcium carbonate, is acquired from waste products that would otherwise go unused, making their carbon output neutral. The basis of this claim is limited, however.
