= Extrusion welding =

Joining method for thermoplastics and composites

Extrusion welding is one of the processes used to weld thermoplastics and composites, developed in the 1960s as an evolution of hot gas welding. It can be a manual or automated process.

The process uses a welding head that has a nozzle for hot air and an extruder that pushes filler material out. The process entails heating the joining (faying) surfaces and adding molten or plasticized filler material (extrudate) by extruding it through a die (shoe). The process applies extrudate with pressure to ensure good bonding, and then allows the part to cool.

== Welding steps ==
The steps of this welding process are similar to other plastic welding processes and involve:

- Surface preparation of base material - machining the required groove as per joint design and cleaning the faying surfaces by scraping. This removes dirt and oxides from the joining surfaces, which would potentially contaminate the finished weld.
- Fit-up of weld joint - tack welding the base material components (using hot gas welding) or using a clamping system
- Welding - adding the extrudate while applying pressure
- Finishing of the final weld appearance - Removing flash with a scraper in order to avoid stress notches. This step may or may not be necessary.
- Cooling - Allowing the part to cool down so it is ready for use

Preheat is required at the initial start of the weld. This is typically achieved by using the hot air nozzle on the welding gun and fanning the starting area. Once welding has commenced, proper travel speed and gun angle will ensure that the upcoming faying surface has been sufficiently preheated.

The filler material is a polymer that comes in the form of spooled strands or in pellets.

== Joint configuration ==
Most weld joints are designed to be a single pass, but plates over 30 mm thickness will require multiple passes. Because most passes are designed to be done in a single pass, extrusion welding typically takes less overall time to perform as compared to other plastic welding processes, particularly its predecessor, hot gas welding.

Joint design include:

- Butt joints
  - Single-V
  - Double-V
- T-Joints
- Overlap joints

Butt joints will be single-V or double-V groove with 45-90° and 0–2 mm root gap. If welding a double-V groove, welding will need to be performed in a minimum of two passes.

T-joints will normally have a single bevel of 45-60° and 0–2 mm root gap.

Both TYK connections for piping and fillet welds are achievable as well.

== Applications ==
Extrusion welding is an attractive process for applications that take advantage of its ability to weld thick sections quickly. For some applications, especially where there are large geometry parts where more traditional plastic welding methods (such as hot plate welding) is not possible, extrusion welding is the only feasible and cost effect option. In particular, tanks for liquid waste, corrosive materials, water supply are common applications. As long as a sealing bond is achieved, extrusion welding can be used for waterproofing applications as well.

== Materials ==
Extrusion welding has seen the most success in welding different types of polyolefins.

Common materials welded with this process are:

- Polyethylene (PE), in particular high-density polyethylene
- Polypropylene (PP)
- Polyvinyl chloride (PVC)
- Polyvinylidene fluoride (PVDF)

== Equipment ==
While there are various forms of extrusion welding equipment, there are three main components that every extrusion welding setup contains:

=== Extruder ===
The extruder is the part of the setup that actually feeds extrudate through the system. The setup of the extruder depends on if the extrudate is in pellet or in spooled strand form. When spooled strands are used, the spool is fed through a tube into the welding head and then exits through the shoe. When pellets are used for extrudate, the pellets are fed into a hopper, then a heated spiral extruder forces them through the welding head and out through the shoe as molten filler material. Pellets can only be used when welding is being performed in the flat or horizontal position.

=== Radiant heat source ===
For most applications, the radiant heat source will be hot air. The air is heated and blown through a nozzle that is part of the weld head setup. Different nozzle geometries are available, and the welder may select a certain nozzle depending on the joint configuration. Although there is a general purpose nozzle, certain nozzles ensure more thorough or more focused heating of a given joint type. Although hot air is usually used as the means for preheat, halogen lamps are sometimes used as the means for preheating the faying surface.

=== Welding shoe ===
The welding shoe is the die at the end of the feed through which the filler material is being extruded. Typically, the shoe is made out of polytetrafluoroethylene (PTFE) because of PTFE's non-stick properties. Welding shoes come in various shapes and sizes depending on the joint design that is being welded. The welding shoe will also have guide nipples that prevent the molten extrudate from flowing in an undesired direction.

== Welding parameters ==
There are several main welding parameters, and each of them have a different bearing on the welding process. Some are dependent on the welder, whereas others can be set on the machine before welding commences. Getting a good balance of each parameter is the key to achieving strong and aesthetic welds. Automation or skill by an experienced welder, coupled with properly set parameters will result in consistent and reproducible welds.

=== Welding speed ===
Welding speed or travel speed, is the rate at which the weld is traversing down the weld joint. For an automated system, the welding speed can be set before the machine starts to go. With a manual setup, the travel speed will depend on the welder. If the travel speed is too fast, there won't be enough filler material deposited, resulting in a small weld bead. Traveling too quickly may also not provide enough time to get sufficient heat to the faying surfaces. This will result in poor adhesion of the extrudate to the faying surface. This poor adhesion leads to poor strength of the welded part. Conversely, if the travel speed is too low, then too much filler material will be deposited, resulting in an unaesthetic weld and potentially flash formation which will then need to be removed.

=== Position of the welding head ===
Position of the welding gun is essential to ensure that the extrudate is being deposited in the right area. When a manual system is being used, the welder will need to ensure that the welding head is aimed correctly. If there is misalignment between the gun and the joint, the material will not be deposited to the correct area. To help guide the welder, the weld shoe will be specifically shaped for a given joint geometry so that the position is maintained throughout welding.

=== Temperature of the extrudate ===
The temperature of the extrudate will be set on the extruder before welding begins. The temperature must be high enough such that the extrudate will be sufficiently fluid to flow, but not so high that the polymer filler material will begin to chemically breakdown. The ideal temperature for the extrudate will be dependent on what polymer being used.

=== Airflow rate and air temperature ===
Studies by have found that airflow rate and temperature are the two biggest factors in the development of creep strength of the welded parts. This is because airflow rate and air temperature are the two biggest factors in development of a melt layer prior to welding. The melt layer is the layer of molten polymer on top of the faying surface. When the melt layer reaches an ideal thickness for welding, the creep strength of the welds increase dramatically. Like with the temperature of the extrudate however, the ideal temperature and airflow rate for base material will depend on what polymer is being welded. Additionally, airflow may be altered depending on the shape of the nozzle.

=== Extrusion rate ===
Extrusion rate is how much extrudate is actually being transferred into the joint at any given time. Along with extrudate temperature and airflow rate/temperature, extrusion rate must be balanced in order to achieve ideal weld properties. If not enough material is added, then there won't be complete fusion of the joint. Conversely, if too much filler is added, then there is potential to create flash or sharp point at the toes of the weld cap. These would act as stress risers and dramatically decrease the strength of the weld both in dynamic and fatigue loading.

== Advantages and disadvantages ==
=== Advantages ===
The main advantage of extrusion welding is that it can achieve very high deposition rates of filler material into a joint, thus cutting down on cycle time. As compared to hot gas welding, which is a polymer welding process that could have many of the same applications, the time to completion for a weld is as much as 5-6x faster.

With proper parameters, the fusion areas of the weld will actually not be the weakest part of a given fabricated polymeric part.

Because many of the main welding parameters are preset on the machine, getting consistent high quality welds is possible.

=== Disadvantages ===
If using manual extrusion welding, the welder must have a certain amount of skill in order to produce sound welds. This is especially true when welding in vertical or overhead positions. Furthermore, a manual machine could be as heavy as 12 kg, which would prove to be cumbersome.
