= Softening point =

The softening point is the temperature at which a material softens beyond some arbitrary softness. It can be determined, for example, by the Vicat method (ASTM-D1525 or ISO 306), Heat Deflection Test (ASTM-D648) or a ring and ball method (ISO 4625 or ASTM E28-67/E28-99 or ASTM D36 or ASTM D6493 - 11 or JIS K 6863). A ring and ball apparatus can also be used for the determination of softening point of bituminous materials.

== See also ==
- Glass Transition Temperature
