= Electrofusion =

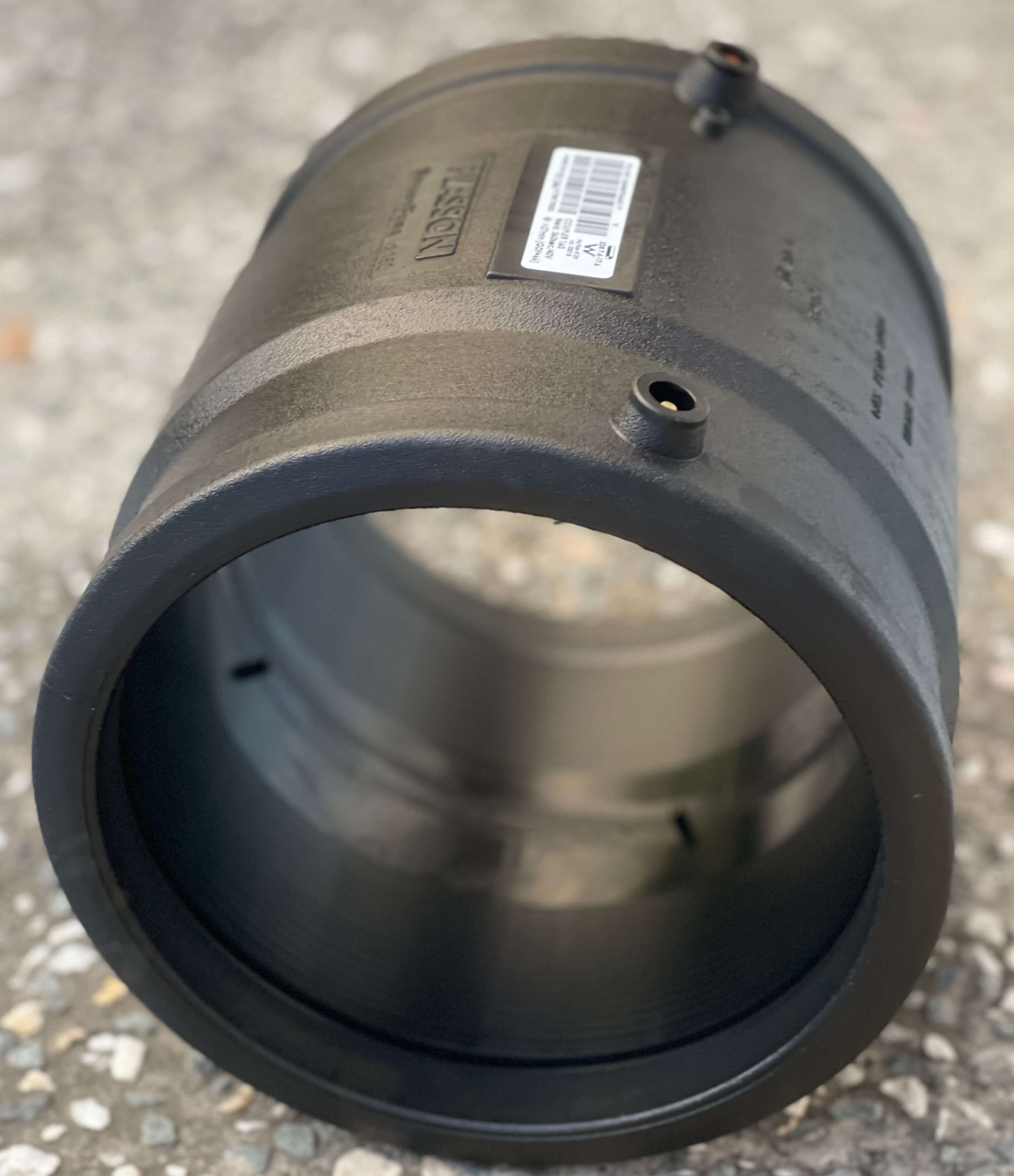
Electrofusion pipe fitting

Electrofusion is a method of joining MDPE, HDPE and other plastic pipes using special fittings that have built-in electric heating elements which are used to weld the joint together.

The pipes to be joined are cleaned, inserted into the electrofusion fitting and then alignment clamps and a voltage (typically 40V) is applied for a fixed time depending on the fitting in use. The built in heater coils then melt the inside of the fitting and the outside of the pipe wall, which weld together producing a very strong homogeneous joint. The assembly is then left to cool for a specified time.

Electrofusion welding is beneficial because it does not require the operator to use dangerous or sophisticated equipment. After some preparation, the electrofusion welder will guide the operator through the steps to take. Welding heat and time is dependent on the type and size of the fitting. All electrofusion fittings are not created equal – precise positioning of the energising coils of wire in each fitting ensures uniform melting for a strong joint and the minimisation of welding and cooling time.

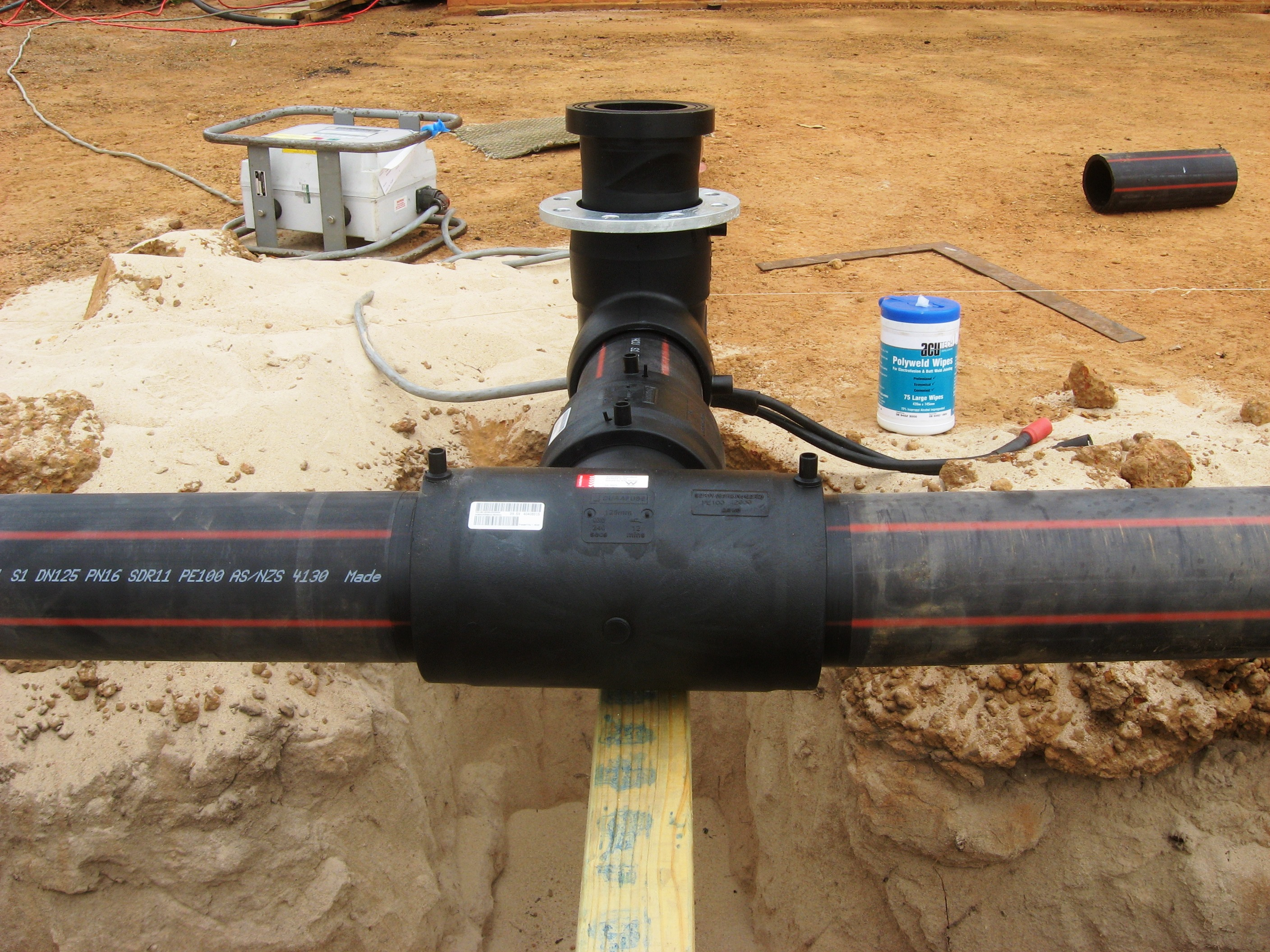
A HDPE ring main that has been joined with an electrofusion tee, and an elbow.

The operator must be qualified according to the local and national laws. In Australia, an electrofusion course can be done within 8 hours. Electrofusion welding training focuses on the importance of accurately fusing EF fittings. Both manual and automatic methods of calculating electrofusion time gives operators the skills they need in the field. There is much to learn about the importance of preparation, timing, pressure, temperature, cool down time and handling, etc.

Training and certification are very important in this field of welding, as the product can become dangerous under certain circumstances. There has been cases of major harm and death, including when molten polyethylene spurts out of the edge of a mis-aligned weld, causing skin burns. Another case was due to a tapping saddle being incorrectly installed on a gas line, causing the death of the two welders in the trench due to gas inhalation. There are many critical parts to electrofusion welding that can cause weld failures, most of which can be greatly reduced by using welding clamps, and correct scraping equipment.

To keep their qualification current, a trained operator can get their fitting tested, which involves cutting open the fitting and examining the integrity of the weld.
