= HDT (data format) =

HDT (Header, Dictionary, Triples) is a data structure and format for serialization which optimizes data compression while still making the media available for web navigation.

The key elements of the format are the header, the dictionary or associative array, and the semantic triple.

Various research projects have piloted use of the format, including with MapReduce, in comparison with CBOR, and increasing computing efficiency.
