= Heat deflection temperature =

Temperature at which a material deforms

Heat deflection temperature or heat distortion temperature (DTUL, HDT, or HDTUL) is the temperature at which a polymer or plastic sample deforms under a specified load. The HDT of a given plastic material is applied in many aspects to the design, engineering, and manufacturing of products which use thermoplastic components.

== Determination ==
The heat distortion temperature is determined by the following test procedure outlined in ASTM D648. The test specimen is loaded in three-point bending in the edgewise direction. The outer fiber stress used for testing is either 0.455 MPa or 1.82 MPa, and the temperature is increased at 2 °C/min until the specimen deflects 0.25 mm. This is similar to the test procedure defined in the ISO 75 standard.

Limitations that are associated with the determination of the HDT is that the sample is not thermally isotropic and, in thick samples in particular, will contain a temperature gradient. The HDT of a particular material can also be very sensitive to stress experienced by the component which is dependent on the component’s dimensions. The selected deflection of 0.25 mm (which is 0.2% additional strain) is selected arbitrarily and has no particular physical significance.

== Application in injection molding ==
An injection molded plastic part is considered "safe" to remove from its mold once it is near or below the HDT. This means that part deformation will be held within acceptable limits after removal. The molding of plastics by necessity occurs at high temperatures (routinely 200 °C or higher) due to the high viscosity of plastics in fluid form (this issue can be addressed to some extent by the addition of plasticizers to the melt, which is a secondary function of a plasticizer). Once plastic is in the mold, it must be cooled to a temperature to which little or no dimensional change will occur after removal. In general, plastics do not conduct heat well and so will take quite a while to cool to room temperature. One way to mitigate this is to use a cold mold (thereby increasing heat loss from the part). Even so, the cooling of the part to room temperature can limit the mass production of parts.

Choosing a resin with a higher heat deflection temperature (and therefore closer to melting temperature) can allow manufacturers to achieve a much faster molding process than they would otherwise while maintaining dimensional changes within certain limits.

== See also ==
- Vicat softening point
