= Vicat softening point =

Determination of the softening point for materials that have no definite melting point

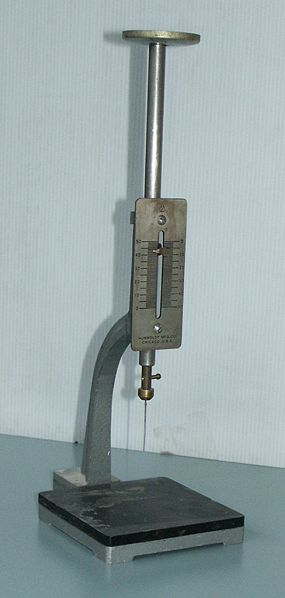
Vicat needle for cement paste solidification time measurement

Vicat softening temperature or Vicat hardness is the determination of the softening point for materials that have no definite melting point, such as plastics. It is taken as the temperature at which the specimen is penetrated to a depth of 1 mm by a flat-ended needle with a 1 mm^{2} circular or square cross-section. For the Vicat A test, a load of 10 N is used. For the Vicat B test, the load is 50 N. It is named after the French engineer Louis Vicat.

Standards to determine Vicat softening point include ASTM D 1525 and ISO 306, which are largely equivalent.

One advantage of measuring the softening point using the Vicat test rather than heat deflection temperature is that the Vicat is less sensitive to internal stresses introduced by processes like injection molding.

The Vicat softening temperature can be used to compare the heat-characteristics of different materials.

Four different methods may be used for testing.

Method	Load	Heating rate
	(N)	(°C/h)
A50	10	50
B50	50	50
A120	10	120
B120	50	120

ISO 10350 Note

ISO 10350 Vicat values are tested using the B50 method.

Similar Standards: ASTM D1525
