= Hot gas welding =

Hot-gas welding is a manual plastic welding process for joining thermoplastic materials. A hot-gas torch is used to direct hot air to both the joint surface and weld rod, heating the materials to their softening temperature. Application of pressure on the heated weld rod to the joint surface bonds the materials together to form a completed weld. This technique is not easily automatized and is primarily used for repairs or individual manufacturing needs of small or complex components.

== Welding techniques ==
There are two common forms of welding techniques used in hot gas welding: hand welding and speed welding. Tack welding may be utilized to set the components in position to perform the actual welding process.

=== Hand welding ===
Hand welding is a technique in which the weld rod is applied to the joint by the welder directly. This is also referenced as free-hand welding or fan welding. The hot gas torch is maneuvered in one hand to heat both the weld rod and joint surfaces in a pendulum manner in quick succession. Pressure is applied to the welding rod and controlled by hand without the assistance of a nozzle. This technique is suitable for most configurations and can be beneficial for welding tight, constrained areas or complex joint designs since application of the welding rod is only limited to the achievable welding positions.

=== Speed welding ===
Speed welding employs a specially designed nozzle which enables the hot gas torch and weld rod to be one cohesive system. The nozzle facilitates application of the weld rod to the joint through a feeder tube. The nozzle evenly heats the weld rod material and allows for a controlled application of pressure. The bottom of the nozzle is designed to heat the joint surface and guide the weld rod into the groove. Nozzles are manufactured for the feeder tubes to accommodate specific welding rod shapes and dimensions and are available for round or triangular rods of common sizes. Use of speed welding is limited to applications of simple joint design and orientation due to the size of the nozzle and maneuverability of the system.

== Process parameters ==
Gas temperature, application pressure, weld travel speed, gas flow rate, and torch orientation all influence the integrity and mechanical properties of the finished weld. Gas temperature and flow rate are controllable parameters based on system inputs. Application pressure, weld travel speed, and torch orientation are all dependent upon the operator performing the weld. These parameters are interrelated and all have a significant impact on the final quality of the weld.

=== Gas temperature and flow rate ===
Gas temperature is a controlled input that should be monitored for accuracy prior to initiating the welding process. Hot gas temperatures are selected at values above the material's melting or glass transition temperature. Sufficient temperature is required to overcome a materials activation energy, resulting in a reduction of the viscosity and an increase in flowability to support diffusion across the weld interface. Prolonged exposure to elevated temperatures exceeding material manufacturer's recommendations can result in oxidation, distortion, or molecular deterioration, which can lead to joint failure. Calibration and verification of the output should be performed after the gas temperature has stabilized in the welding gun. Speed tip nozzles focus heat directly on the joint in a specific region, resulting in effective heat transfer to the weld surfaces. If sufficient weld travel speed is not maintained, recommended welding temperatures above the glass or melting temperature of the material in these weld regions can be exceeded and lead to defects.

Thermal expansion from the welding process may result in distortion and development of weld defects if part components are not properly secured. Work surface material should also be considered to avoid heat losses which may result in lack of penetration or lack of fusion due to inadequate heating of the joint surfaces.

Sufficient hot gas flow rate is necessary to maintain adequate, even heating of weld rod and joint surfaces. Flow rate can be controlled through the use of a blower or an air compressor. To avoid weld contamination, supplied hot gas should be free of moisture and should not contain impurities. A properly sized blower or compressor can be utilized for multiple hot gas torches if one is not integrated in the individual welding gun.

==== Welding energy ====
The welding energy imparted on the weld surface during hot gas welding can be used to predict the overall strength of the finished joint. Welding energy (E_{w}) is determined using the gas temperature and flow rate using the following relationship:

$E_w = \frac{c_p \bigl(T_2 - T_1\bigr)q_v\rho}{S_w}$

where hot gas parameters include the specific heat (c_{p}), initial and final temperature (T_{1} and T_{2}, respectively), volumetric flow rate (q_{v}), and density ($\rho$). These properties are divided by the weld travel speed (S_{w}). Studies performed on semi-crystalline materials conclude the higher the welding energy input on the surface, the higher the joint strength. A high welding energy has been related to a lower welding surface viscosity. A less viscous surface allows for increased diffusion across the weld interface resulting in a stronger weld, whereas a higher viscosity does not support diffusion as easily and can result in lower joint strength.

Hot gas properties vary depending on the type of medium used for welding. Air is used in most applications. In certain instances, the material manufacturer may recommend use of other types of hot gas such as carbon dioxide or nitrogen when a potential health and safety risk may be present under other welding conditions.

=== Pressure ===
Application pressure impacts the overall weld penetration and joint quality. Pressure is manually applied either through the weld rod directly or to the speed tip nozzle. Welding technique and joint design both influence the amount of pressure that is translated to the weld.

Inadequate pressure can result in weld interface porosity, poor wettability, and lack of fusion defects. Hot gas can become trapped between the weld rod and joint surface resulting in pore formation. One way to reduce the presence of pores is to establish a root gap as part of the joint design through which hot gases can escape. Unfused regions of the weld and presence of pores can significantly reduce the overall strength of the joint.

Pressure application can be less effective in hand welding compared to utilizing a speed tip; however both are dependent upon the skill of the operator. Double-V joint designs are well-suited for carrying higher effective welding pressure as compared to single-V joints and are less prone to fusion deficiencies.

=== Weld travel speed ===
Material properties of the components being welded, hot gas temperature, size of the weld rod, and technique utilized all influence the weld travel speed. Due to the manual nature of hot gas welding, this process is typically slower than other thermoplastic welding methods. Higher weld travel speed can be obtained using a speed tip. Localization of high temperature gas on the weld surface allows for thermoplastics to heat up faster and flow easier, resulting in an increase in capable welding speed. Too fast of a welding speed can stretch the weld rod, unevenly filling the joint and compromising the overall weld strength. If the speed is too slow, weld damage from extended high temperature exposure can result.

=== Torch orientation ===
The angle of orientation of the welding torch and welding rod is dependent upon the welding technique, rod material, and joint design.

==== Speed welding ====
To establish consistent pressure while maintaining proper alignment to the joint groove during speed tip welding, it is recommended that the welder position their grip below the hot gas gun. Sufficient penetration and weld quality is achieved when the weld rod is slightly pressured as it is fed through the feeder tube and a simultaneous downward pulling motion is maintained at a constant travel speed throughout the welding pass.

==== Hand welding ====
Orientation of the welding rod to the groove is material dependent in hand welding applications. Recommended weld rod angles are established for materials based on achieving proper penetration without introducing flaws or additional stresses in the joint. Accurate positioning will result in a visible “bow wave” effect at the root, indicating diffusion across the weld interface occurred. Improper angle can result in uneven heating and weld defects or insufficient pressure to produce a strong joint.

== Welder qualifications ==
In industrial applications, hot gas welding processes are successfully executed by trained and qualified operators who have been certified in the process as detailed in EN 13067 or AWS B2.4. EN 13067 is the International standard for qualification of welders for thermoplastic welded assemblies, which includes hot gas welding techniques and processes. The American Welding Society (AWS) published AWS B2.4 as an American standard for qualification for thermoplastic welding procedures and performance. These standards detail proper technique and joint design to be employed for various welding situations.
