= High-density polyethylene =

Class of polyethylenes

HDPE has SPI resin ID code 2

High-density polyethylene (HDPE) is one of several varieties of polyethylene (PE). PE, the dominant synthetic polymer, is produced in many forms that differ in terms of molecular weight, branching, and the incorporation of comonomers. Often these features are captured in terms of the density of the material. All forms of PE are colorless, odorless, rather chemically inert solids produced by the polymerization of ethylene, the monomer. The higher density of HDPE and particularly the lack of significant branching of its polymer chains results in a stronger, harder, more opaque material than lower density PE.

== Properties ==
PE's are often classified by their densities.

Polyethylene (PE) densities and structure
PE type	density (g/cm^{3})	structure
LDPE	ca. 0.924	highly branched
LLDPE	0.916-0.940	contains comonomers
HDPE	ca. 0.961	no branching

In 2008, the global HDPE market reached a volume of more than 30 million tons.

Thermophysical properties of high density polyethylene (HDPE)
Density	961 kg/m^{3}
Melting point	131.8 °C (269.24 °F)
Temperature of crystallization	121.9 °C (251.42 °F)
Latent heat of fusion	188.6 kJ/kg.
Thermal conductivity	0.54 W/m.°C. at °C.
Specific heat capacity	1331 to 2400 J/kg-K
Specific heat (solid)	2.9 kJ/kg. °C.
Crystallinity	61%

HDPE is known for its high strength-to-density ratio. The density of HDPE ranges from 930 to 970 kg/m^{3}. Although the density of HDPE is only marginally higher than that of low-density polyethylene, HDPE has little branching, giving it stronger intermolecular forces and tensile strength (38 MPa versus 21 MPa) than LDPE. The difference in strength exceeds the difference in density, giving HDPE a higher specific strength. It is also harder and more opaque and can withstand somewhat higher temperatures (120 °C/248 °F for short periods). High-density polyethylene, unlike polypropylene, cannot withstand normally required autoclaving conditions. The lack of branching is ensured by an appropriate choice of catalyst (e.g., Ziegler–Natta catalysts) and reaction conditions.

HDPE is resistant to many different solvents, and is exceptionally challenging to glue; joints are typically made by welding.

The physical properties of HDPE can vary depending on the molding process that is used to manufacture a specific sample; to some degree, a determining factor is the international standardized testing methods employed to identify these properties for a specific process. For example, in rotational molding (rotomolding), to identify the environmental stress crack resistance of a sample, the notched constant tensile load test (NCTL) is put to use.

Owing to these desirable properties, pipes constructed out of HDPE are ideally applicable for drinking water and waste water (storm and sewage).

== Applications ==
HDPE pipes. With a high strength-to-density ratio, HDPE is used in the production of plastic bottles, corrosion-resistant piping, geomembranes and plastic lumber. HDPE is commonly recycled, and has the number "2" as its resin identification code.

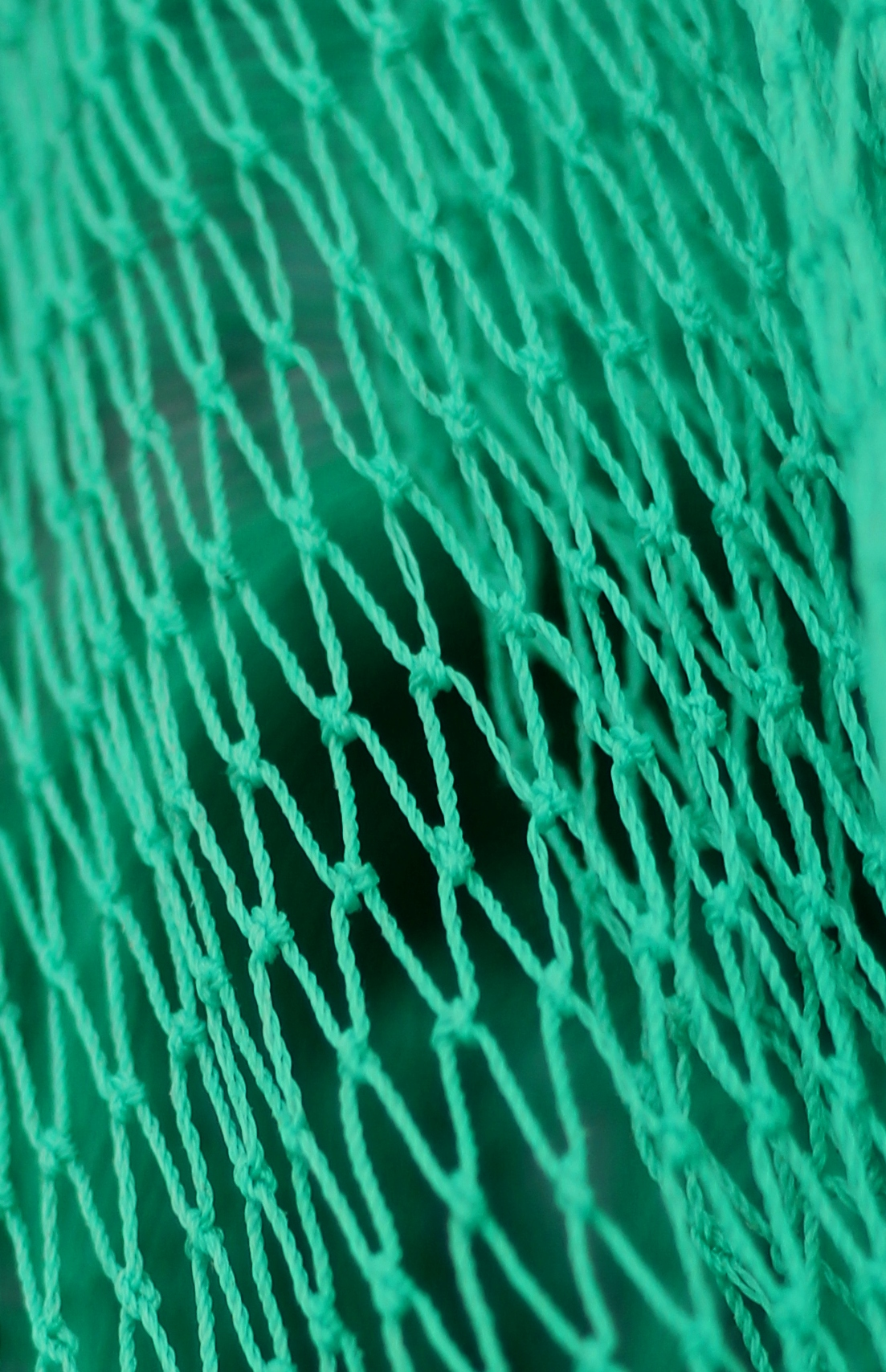
HDPE fibers can be spun into rope

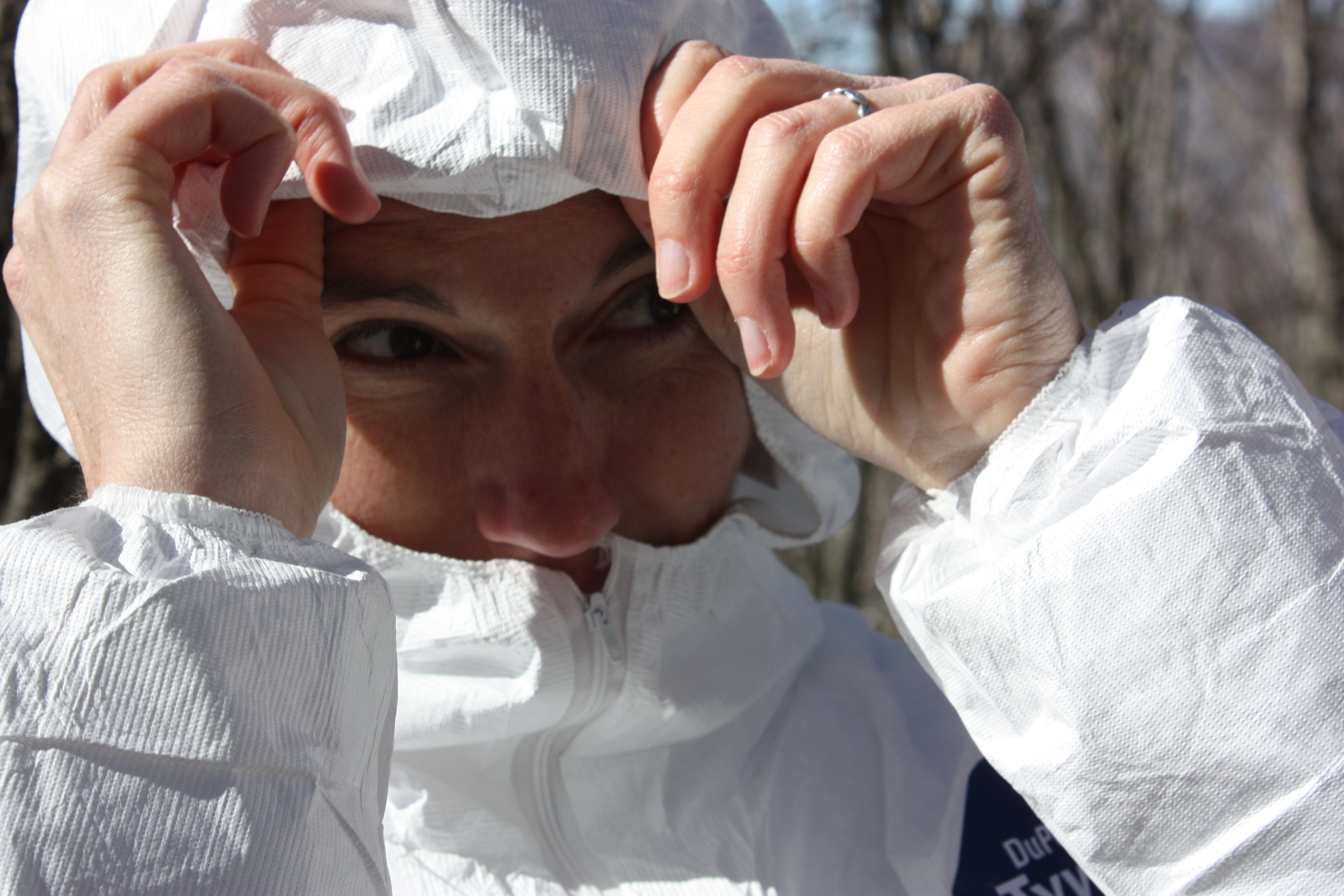
Disposable suits; nonwoven HDPE fabric

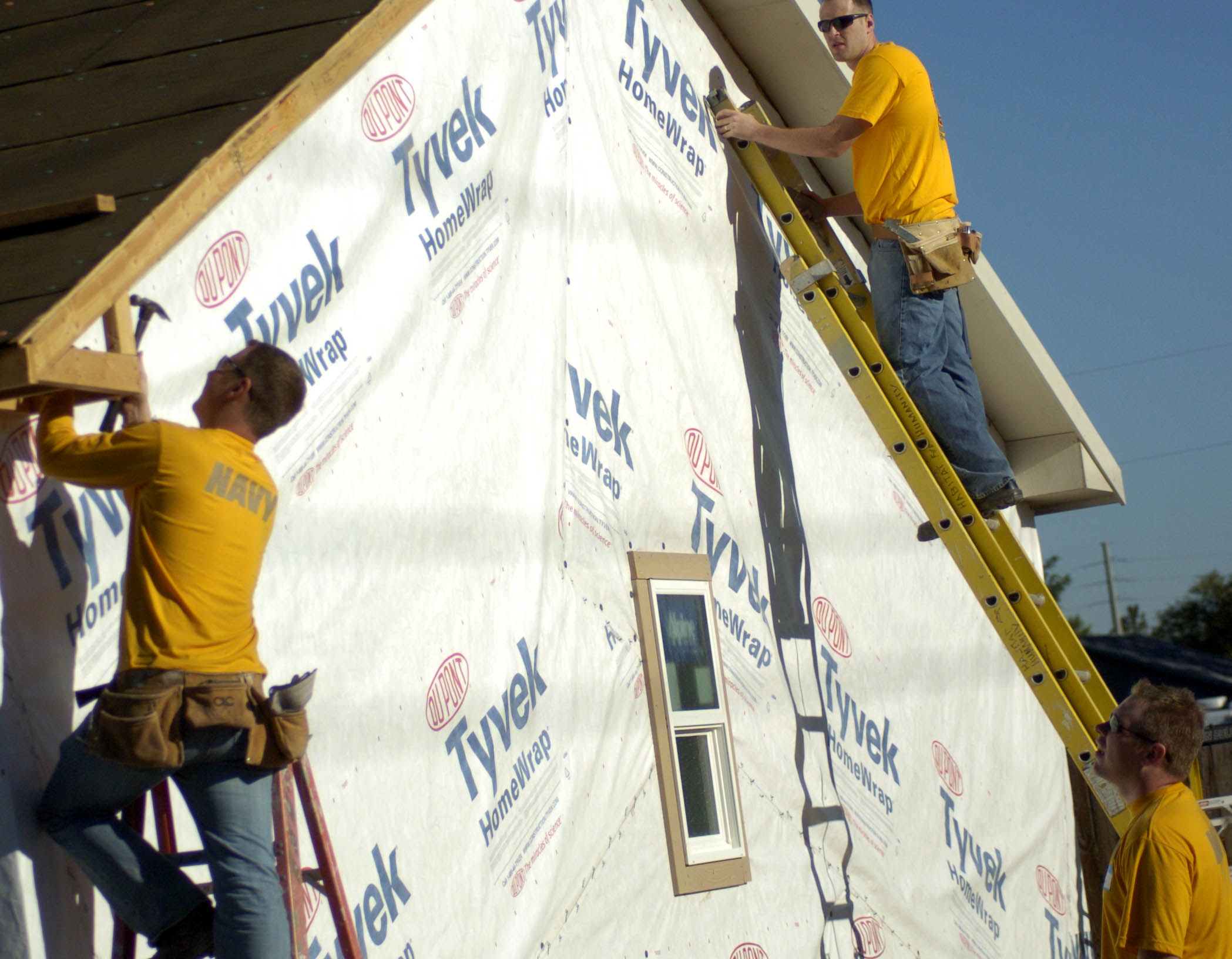
Housewrap

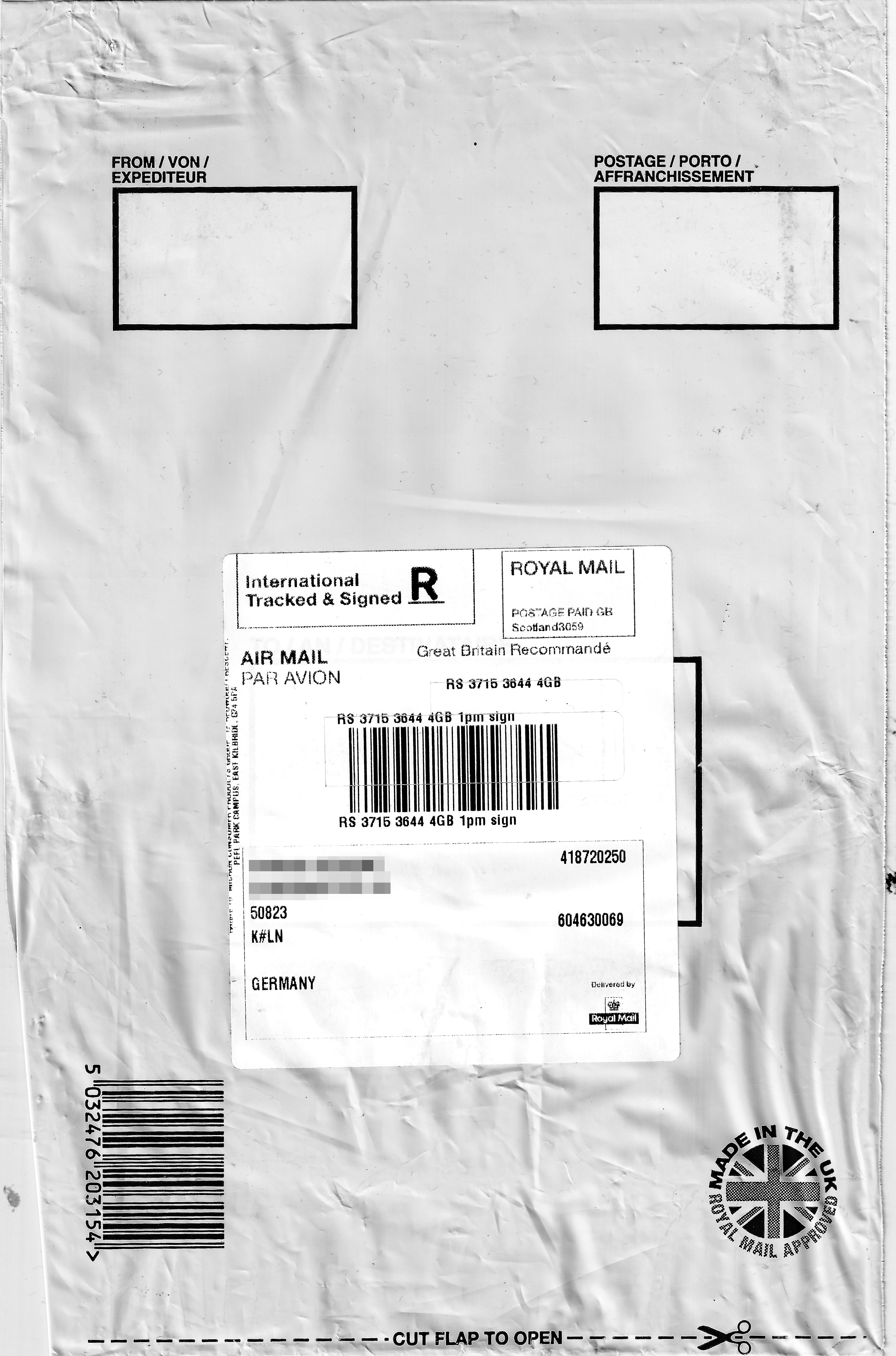
Plastic mailing envelopes

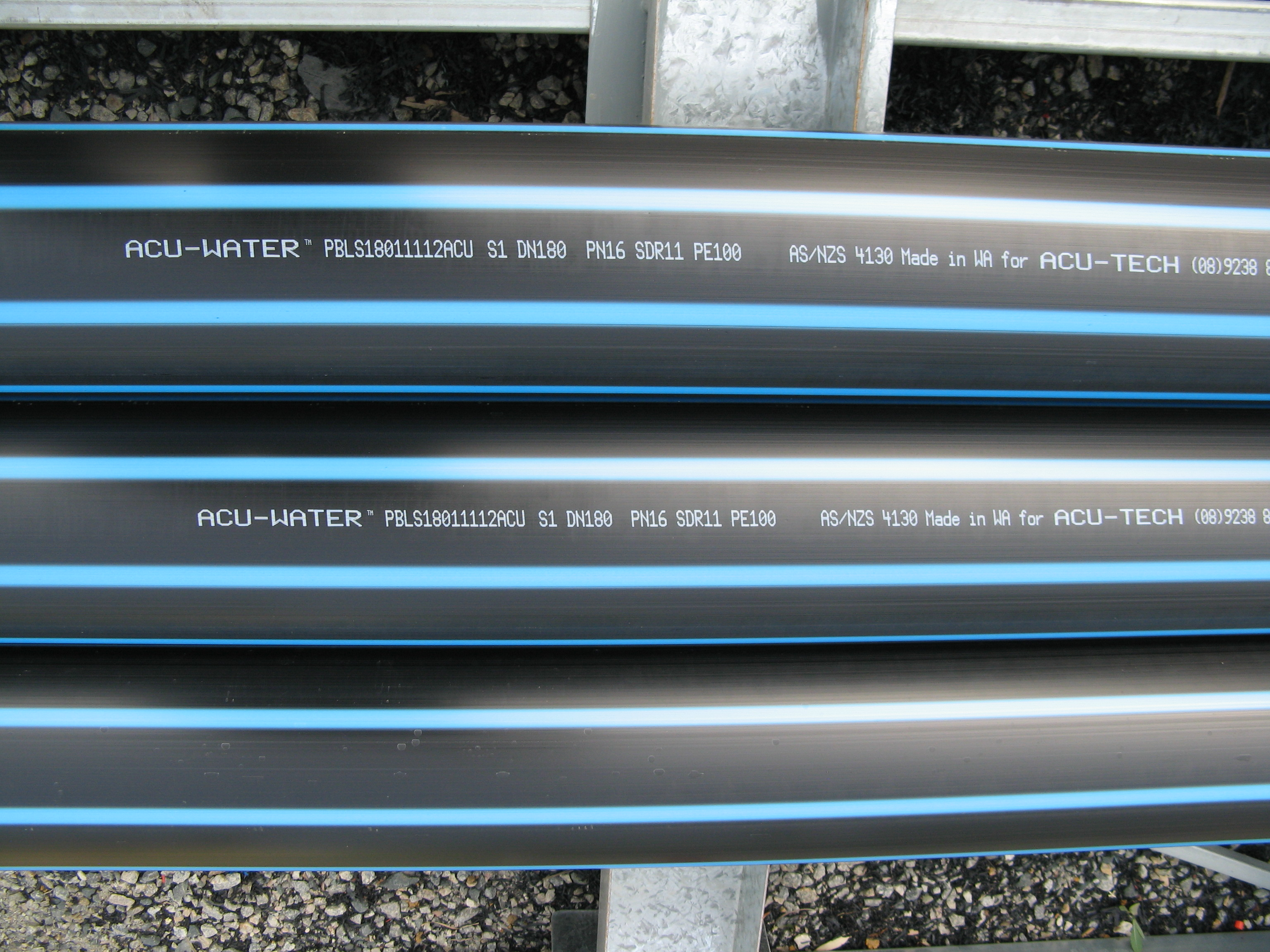
Flexible HDPE pipes

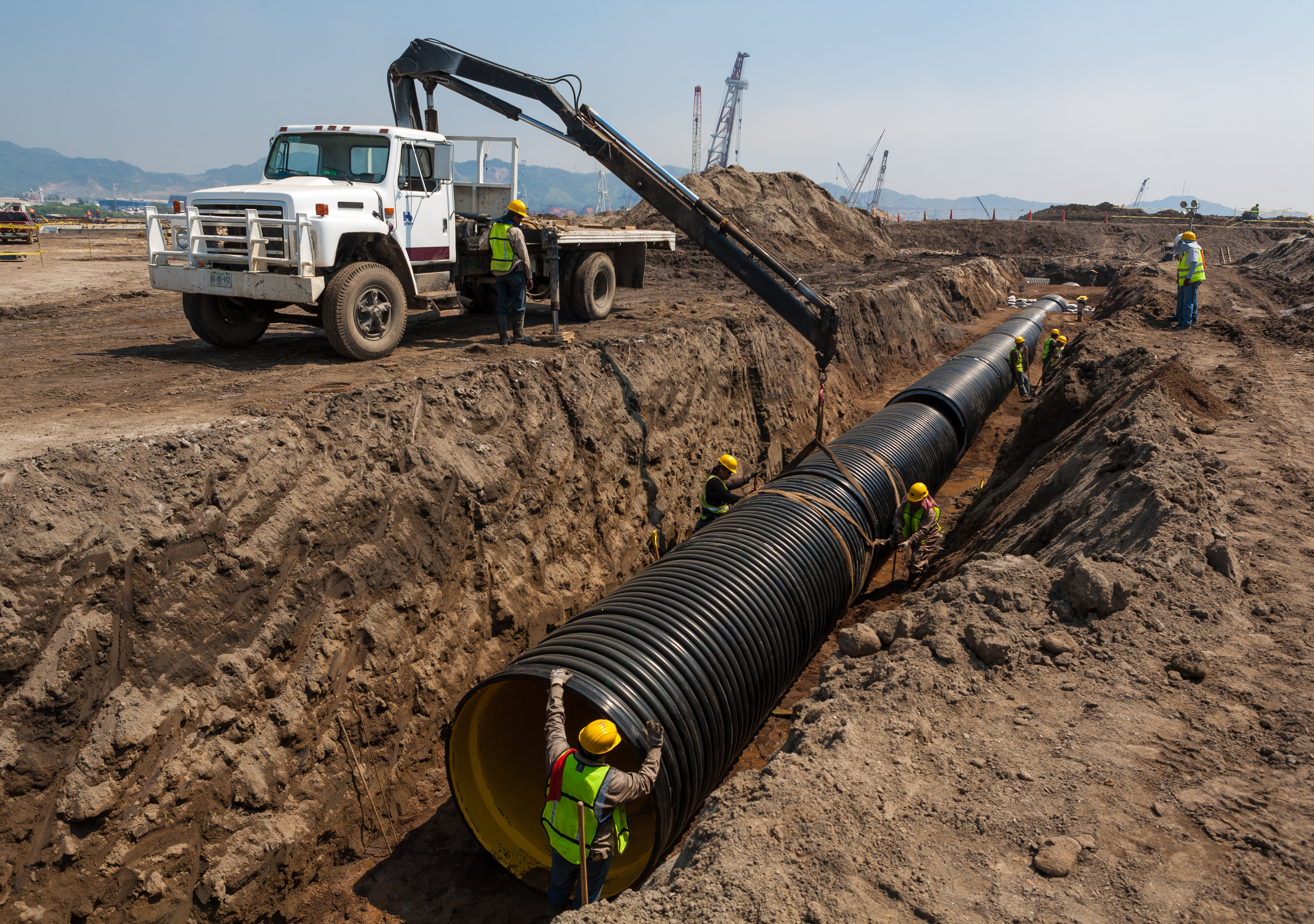
Corrugated HDPE pipe installation in storm drain project in Mexico

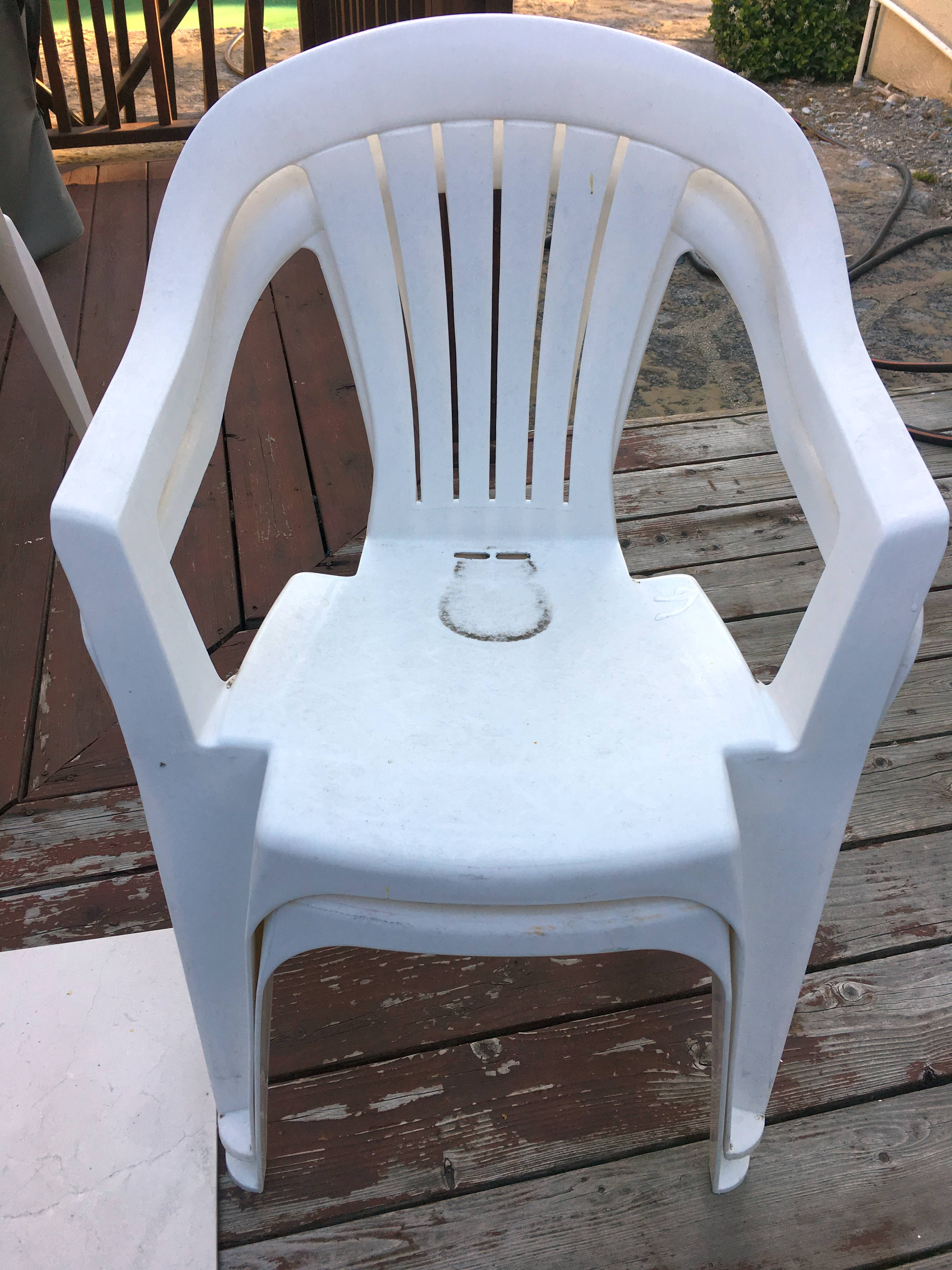
The monobloc chair

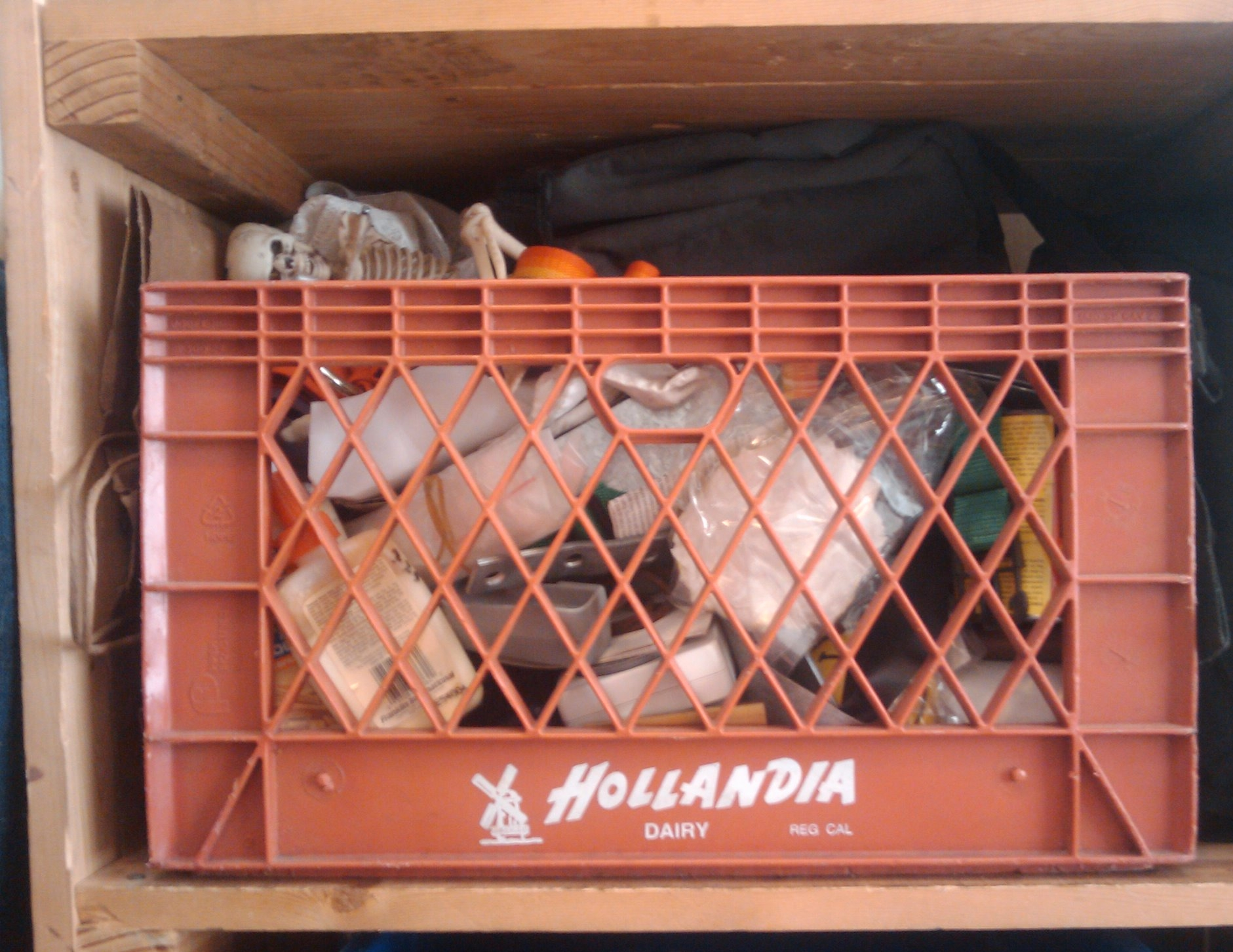
Bottle crates

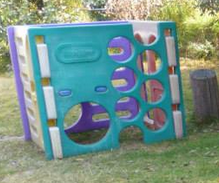
Toys and playground equipment

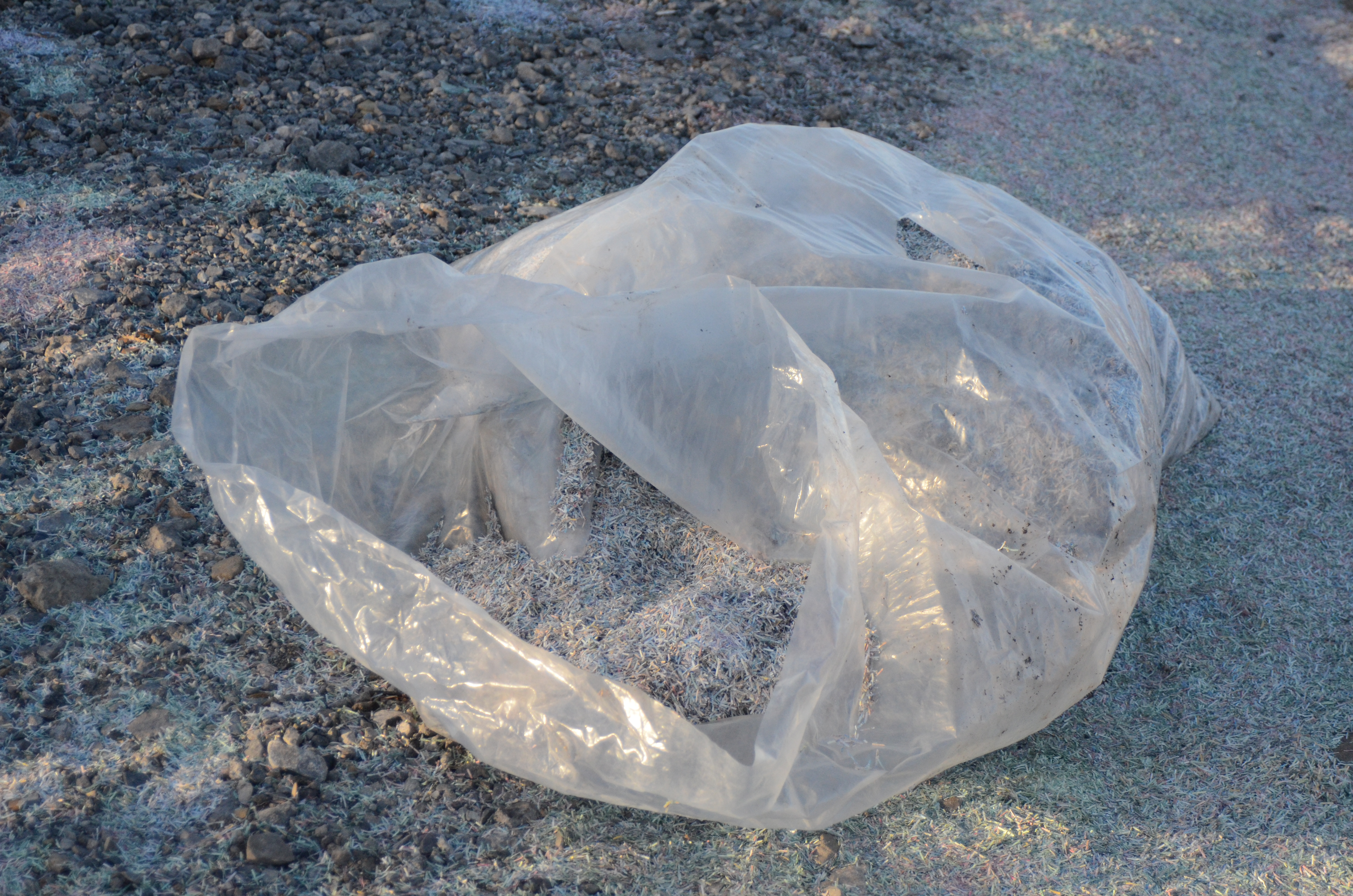
Clear plastic bags (shown) are made of LDPE; blown-film shopping bags with handles are now made of HDPE

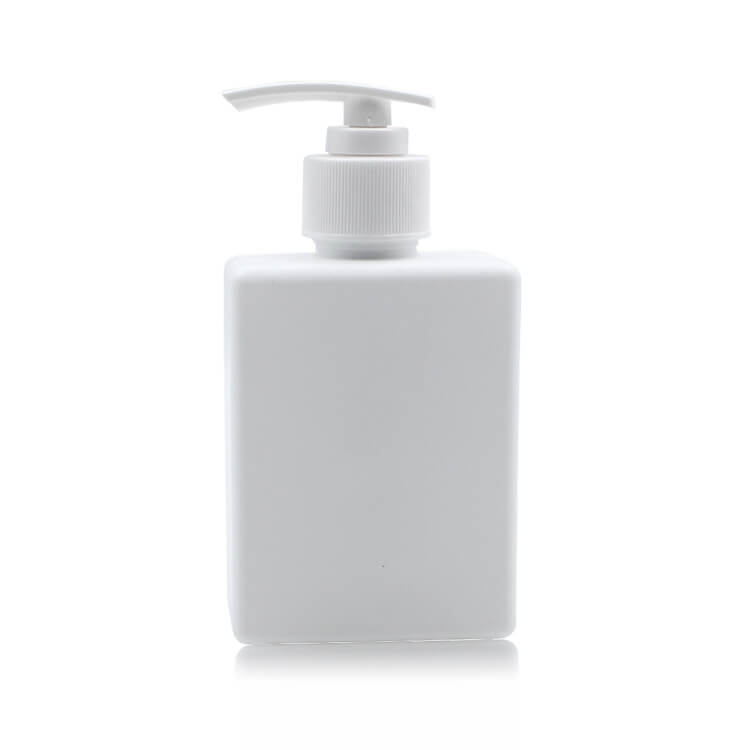
HDPE is used to make sturdy bottles that resist oils. Transparent bottles are usually made of other plastics, such as polyethylene terephthalate

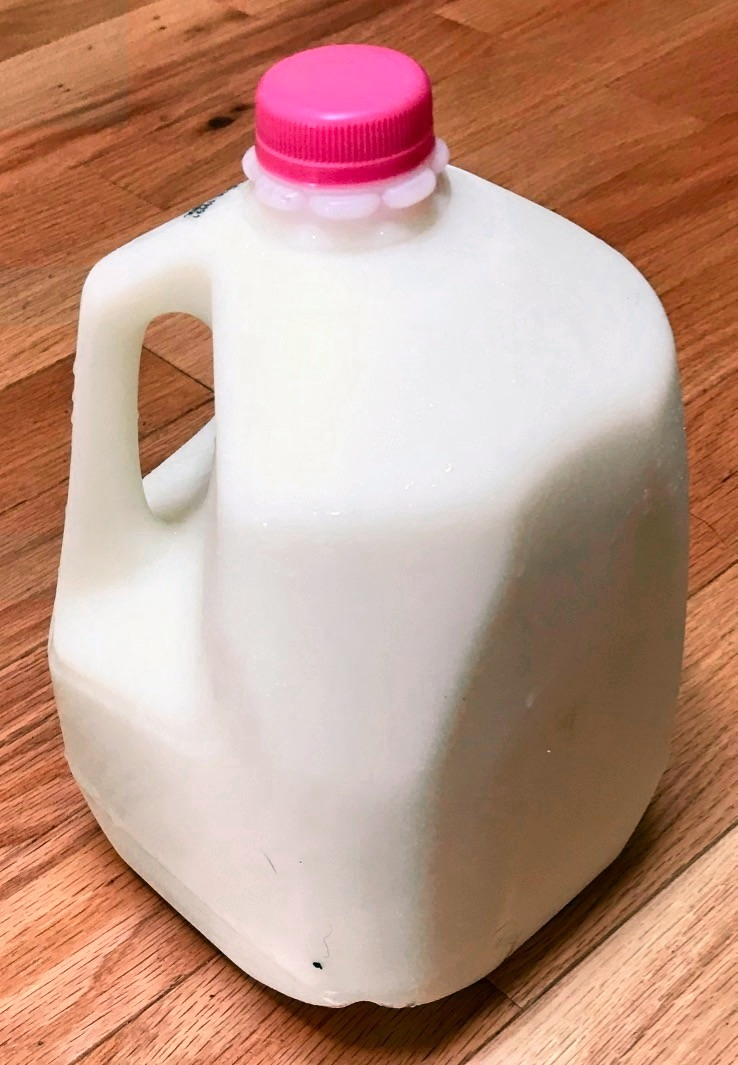
Milk jug

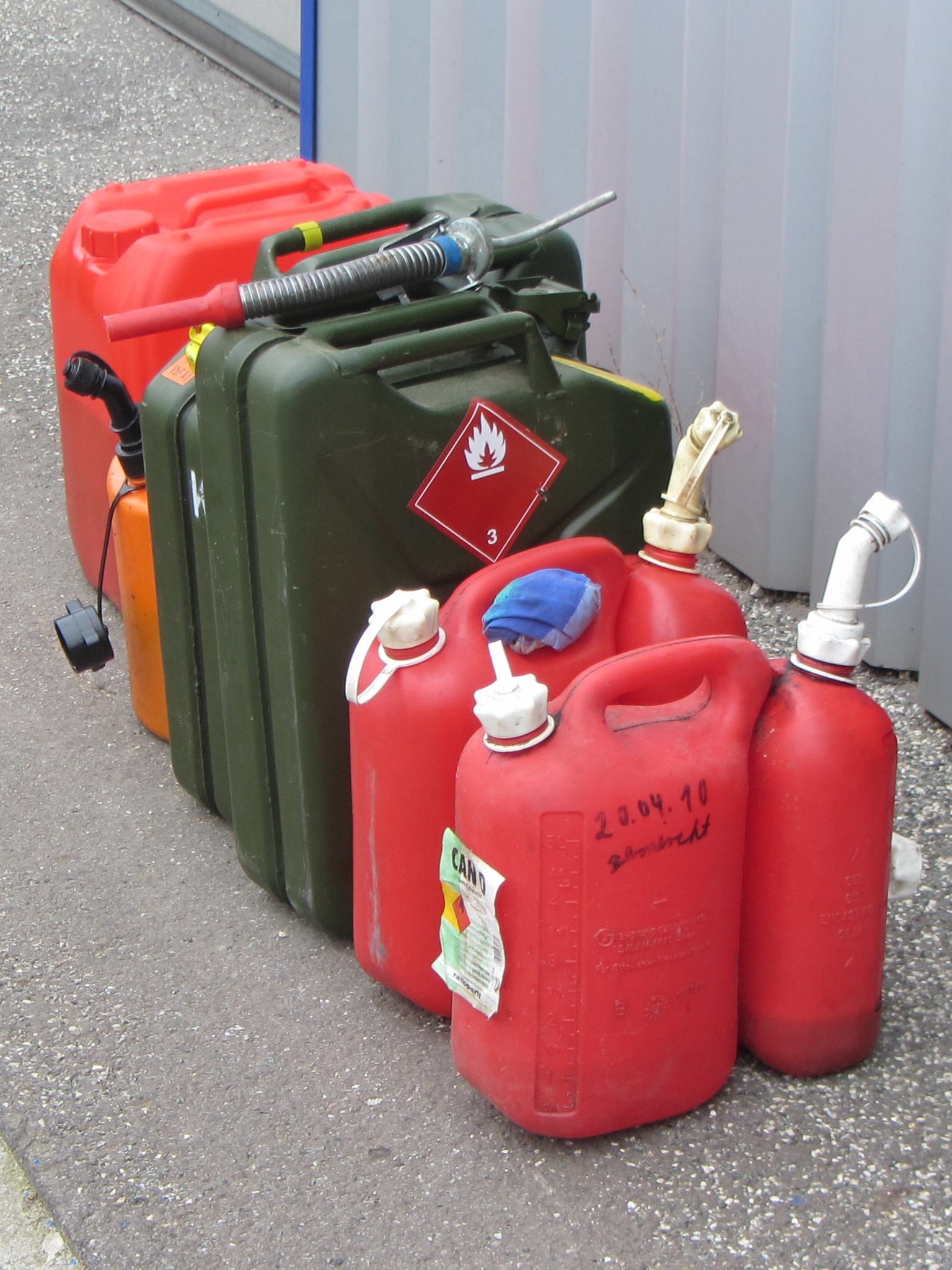
HDPE jerrycans resist softening and swelling from aromatic components of fuels

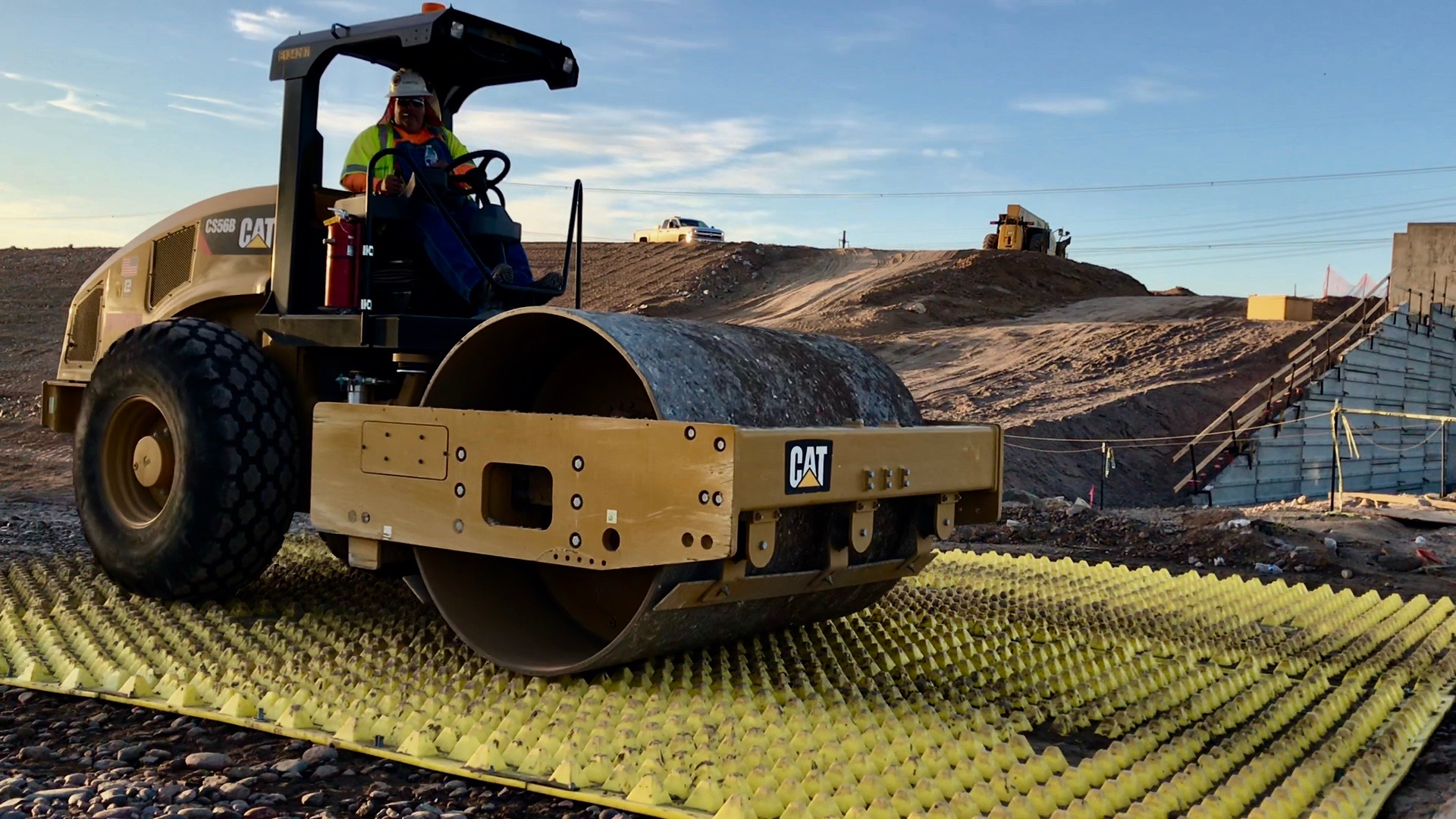
Roller on HDPE construction entrance mat

HDPE has a wide variety of applications; for applications that fall within the properties of other polymers, the choice to use HDPE is usually economic:

- 3D printer filament
- Arena board (puck board)
- Backpacking frames
- Ballistic plates
- Banners
- Bottle caps
- Boats
- Chemical containers
- Chemical-resistant piping
- Coax cable inner insulator
- Conduit protector for electrical or communications cables
- Corrosion protection for steel pipelines
- Electrical and plumbing boxes
- Far-IR lenses
- Fireworks
- Folding chairs and tables
- Food storage containers
- Fuel tanks for vehicles
- Geomembrane for hydraulic applications (such as canals and bank reinforcements)
- Geothermal heat transfer piping systems
- Hard hats and helmets
- Heat-resistant firework mortars
- Housewrap (Tyvek)
- Hovercraft: The material is too heavy and dense for such craft but is still used occasionally
- Ionizing radiation shield
- Laundry detergent jugs
- Luggage transitioned from metal in India
- Lasts for shoes
- Microwave telescope windows
- Milk jugs
- Natural gas distribution pipe systems
- Piping for fluid, slurry and gas purposes
- Plastic bags
- Plastic bottles suitable both for recycling or re-use
- Plastic surgery (skeletal and facial reconstruction)
- Potable water mains
- Root barrier
- Shampoo bottles
- Sewage mains
- Snowboard rails and boxes
- Stone paper
- Storage sheds
- Swimming pool installation
- Trackout control mats
- Telecom ducts
- Water pipes for domestic water supply and agricultural processes
- Wood plastic composites (utilizing recycled polymers)

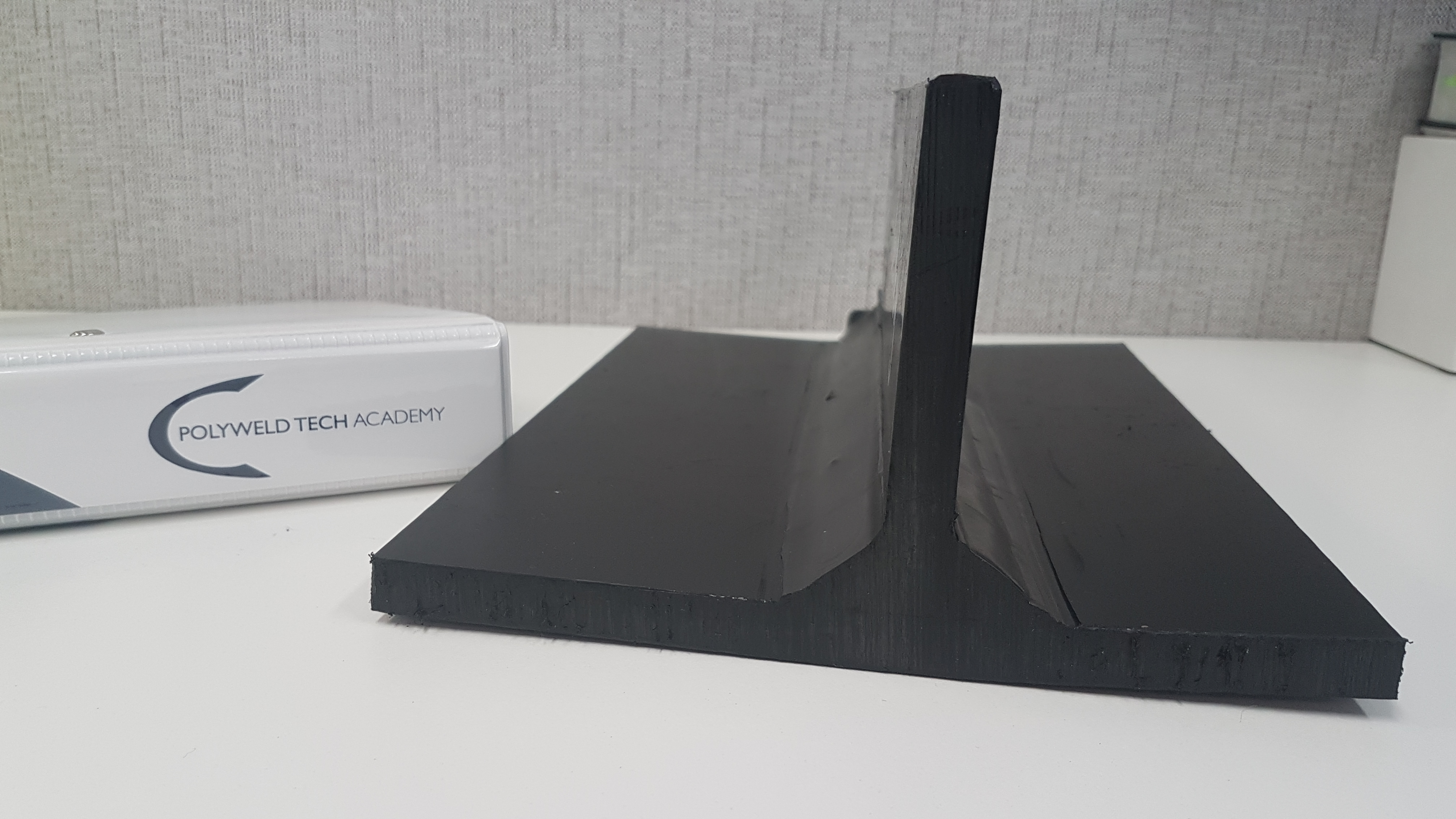
HDPE sheet which has been extrusion welded

HDPE is also used for cell liners in United States subtitle D sanitary landfills, wherein large sheets of HDPE are either extrusion welded or wedge welded to form a homogeneous chemical-resistant barrier, with the intention of preventing the pollution of soil and groundwater by the liquid constituents of solid waste.

HDPE is preferred by the pyrotechnics trade for mortars over steel or PVC tubes, being more durable and safer: HDPE tends to rip or tear in a malfunction instead of shattering and becoming shrapnel like the other materials.

Milk bottles, jugs, and other hollow goods manufactured through blow molding are the most important application area for HDPE, accounting for one-third of worldwide production, or more than 8 million tonnes.

Above all, China, where beverage bottles made from HDPE were first imported in 2005, is a growing market for rigid HDPE packaging as a result of its improving standard of living. In India and other highly populated, emerging nations, infrastructure expansion includes the deployment of pipes and cable insulation made from HDPE. The material has benefited from discussions about possible health and environmental problems caused by PVC and polycarbonate associated bisphenol A (BPA), as well as its advantages over glass, metal, and cardboard.

== Production ==
Industrial production of HDPE from ethylene happens through either Ziegler-Natta polymerization or the Phillips slurry process. The Ziegler-Natta method uses a combination of catalysts, including titanium tetrachloride, in contact with gaseous ethylene to precipitate high-density polyethylene. In a similar way, the Phillips slurry process uses silica-based catalysts in contact with a fast-moving hydrocarbon and polyethylene slurry to precipitate high density polyethylene.

Processing will determine the properties of the HDPE. The method used to synthesize the HDPE is crucial because the micro structure of the HDPE will vary. The Phillips Slurry process results in HDPE with less branching and more precise molecular weights than the Ziegler process, but the Ziegler process provides greater flexibility in the type of polyethylene produced.

The molecular weight of HDPE refers to the length of the polyethylene chains, and helps determine properties such as flexibility, yield strength, and melt temperature. After the precipitate is formed, the temperature, pressure, and cooling time during processing will dictate the degree of crystallinity, with a higher degree of crystallinity resulting in greater rigidity and chemical resistance. Depending on the application, the method and processing steps can be adjusted for an ideal result.

Once the HDPE has been synthesized, it is ready to be used in commercial products. Industrial production methods for HDPE products include injection molding for complex shapes such as toys. Extrusion molding is used for constant-profile products such as pipes and films. Blow molding is intended for hollow products, specifically bottles and plastic bags. Rotational molding is used for large, seamless parts such as chemical drums and kayaks. The method used during processing depends on the product requirements, with each having benefits for a given application.

== See also ==
- Cross-linked polyethylene (PEX)
- HDPE pipe (HDPE)
- Low-density polyethylene (LDPE)
- Linear low-density polyethylene (LLDPE)
- Medium-density polyethylene (MDPE)
- Phillips Disaster
- Plastic recycling
- Polyethylene (PE)
- Resin identification code
- Stretch wrap
- Ultra-high-molecular-weight polyethylene (UHMWPE)
