= Phase boundary =

Interface between solid and liquid phases

In thermal equilibrium, each phase (i.e. liquid, solid etc.) of physical matter comes to an end at a transitional point, or spatial interface, called a phase boundary, due to the immiscibility of the matter with the matter on the other side of the boundary. This immiscibility is due to at least one difference between the two substances' corresponding physical properties. The behavior of phase boundaries has been a developing subject of interest and an active interdisciplinary research field, called interface science, for almost two centuries, due partly to phase boundaries naturally arising in many physical processes, such as the capillarity effect, the growth of grain boundaries, the physics of binary alloys, and the formation of snow flakes.

One of the oldest problems in the area dates back to Lamé and Clapeyron who studied the freezing of the ground. Their goal was to determine the thickness of solid crust generated by the cooling of a liquid at constant temperature filling the half-space. In 1889, Stefan, while working on the freezing of the ground developed these ideas further and formulated the two-phase model which came to be known as the Stefan Problem.

The proof for the existence and uniqueness of a solution to the Stefan problem was developed in many stages. Proving the general existence and uniqueness of the solutions in the case of $d=3$ was solved by Shoshana Kamin.
