= Stefan tube =

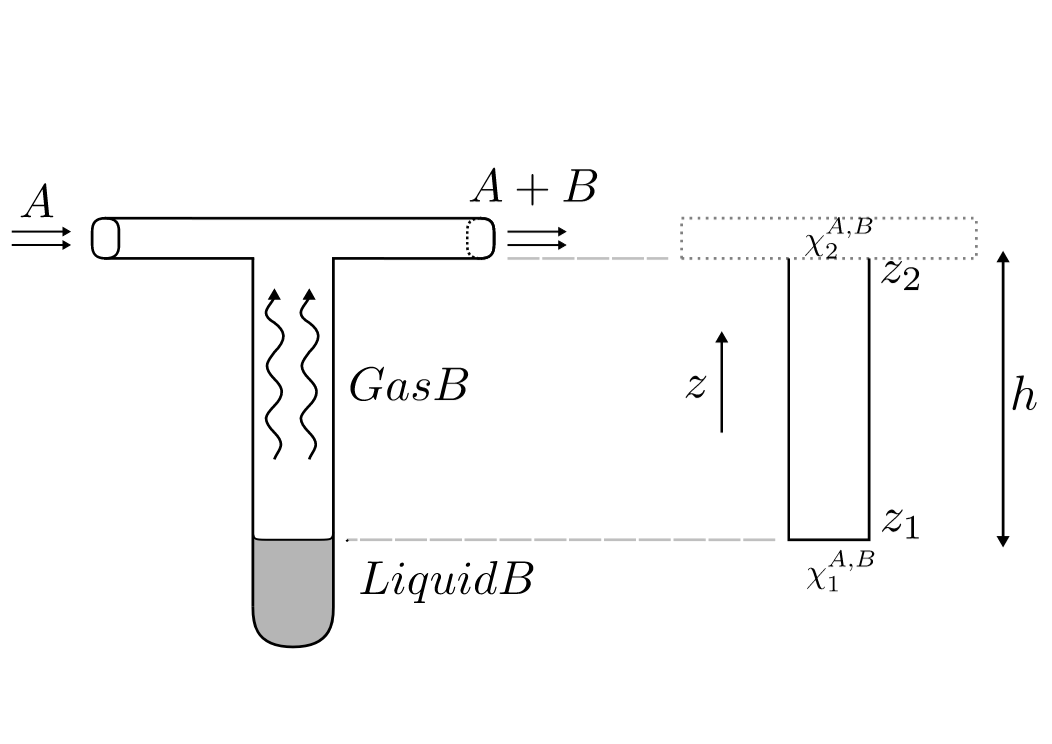
A schematic of a stefan tube. Note that it is not necessary for there to be a cross-wise horizontal tube at the top. On the right, a mathematically equivalent simpler model.

In chemical engineering, a Stefan tube is a device that was devised by Josef Stefan in 1874. It is often used for measuring diffusion coefficients. It comprises a vertical tube, over the top of which a gas flows and at the bottom of which is a pool of volatile liquid that is maintained in a constant-temperature bath. The liquid in the pool evaporates, diffuses through the gas above it in the tube, and is carried away by the gas flow over the tube mouth at the top. One then measures the fall in the level of the liquid in the tube.

The tube conventionally has a narrow diameter, in order to suppress convection.

The way that a Stefan tube is modelled, mathematically, is very similar to how one can model the diffusion of perfume fragrance molecules from (say) a drop of perfume on skin or clothes, evaporating up through the air to a person's nose. There are some differences between the models. However, they turn out to have little effect on results at highly dilute vapour concentrations.

== Analysis ==
In the analysis of the system, various assumptions are made. The liquid, conventionally denoted A, is neither soluble in the gas in the tube, conventionally denoted B, nor reacts with it. The decrease in volume of the liquid A and increase in volume of the gas B over time can be ignored for the purposes of solving the equations that describe the behaviour, and an assumption can be made that the instantaneous flux at any time is the steady state value. There are no radial or circumferential components to the concentration gradients, resulting from convection or turbulence caused by excessively vigorous flow at the upper mouth of the tube, and the diffusion can thus be treated as a simple one-dimensional flow in the vertical direction. The mole fraction of A at the upper mouth of the tube is zero, as a consequence of the gas flow. At the interface between A and B the flux of B is zero (because it is insoluble in A) and the mole fraction is the equilibrium value.

The flux of B, denoted N_{B}, is thus zero throughout the tube, its diffusive flux downward (along its concentration gradient) is balanced by its convective flux upward caused by A.

Applying these assumptions, the system can be modelled using Fick's laws of diffusion or as Maxwell–Stefan diffusion.
