= Stefan flow =

Fluid flow driven by interface effects

The Stefan flow, occasionally called Stefan's flow, is a transport phenomenon concerning the movement of a chemical species by a flowing fluid (typically in the gas phase) that is induced to flow by the production or removal of the species at an interface. Any process that adds the species of interest to or removes it from the flowing fluid may cause the Stefan flow, but the most common processes include evaporation, condensation, chemical reaction, sublimation, ablation, adsorption, absorption, and desorption. It was named after the Slovenian physicist, mathematician, and poet Josef Stefan for his early work on calculating evaporation rates.

The Stefan flow is distinct from diffusion as described by Fick's law, but diffusion almost always also occurs in multi-species systems that are experiencing the Stefan flow. In systems undergoing one of the species addition or removal processes mentioned previously, the addition or removal generates a mean flow in the flowing fluid as the fluid next to the interface is displaced by the production or removal of additional fluid by the processes occurring at the interface. The transport of the species by this mean flow is the Stefan flow. When concentration gradients of the species are also present, diffusion transports the species relative to the mean flow. The total transport rate of the species is then given by a summation of the Stefan flow and diffusive contributions.

An example of the Stefan flow occurs when a droplet of liquid evaporates in air. In this case, the vapor/air mixture surrounding the droplet is the flowing fluid, and liquid/vapor boundary of the droplet is the interface. As heat is absorbed by the droplet from the environment, some of the liquid evaporates into vapor at the surface of the droplet, and flows away from the droplet as it is displaced by additional vapor evaporating from the droplet. This process causes the flowing medium to move away from the droplet at some mean speed that is dependent on the evaporation rate and other factors such as droplet size and composition. In addition to this mean flow, a concentration gradient must exist in the neighborhood of the droplet (assuming an isolated droplet) since the flowing medium is mostly air far from the droplet and mostly vapor near the droplet. This gradient causes Fickian diffusion that transports the vapor away from the droplet and the air towards it, with respect to the mean flow. Thus, in the frame of the droplet, the flow of vapor away from the droplet is faster than for the pure Stefan flow, since diffusion is working in the same direction as the mean flow. However, the flow of air away from the droplet is slower than the pure Stefan flow, since diffusion is working to transport air back towards the droplet against the Stefan flow. Such flow from evaporating droplets is important in understanding the combustion of liquid fuels such as diesel in internal combustion engines, and in the design of such engines. The Stefan flow from evaporating droplets and subliming ice particles also plays prominently in meteorology as it influences the formation and dispersion of clouds and precipitation.
