= Yurii Egorov =

Russian-Soviet mathematician (1938–2018)

Yurii (or Yuri) Vladimirovich Egorov (Юрий Владимирович Егоров, 11 July 1938 – 6 October 2018) was a Russian-Soviet mathematician who specialised in differential equations.

== Life and career ==
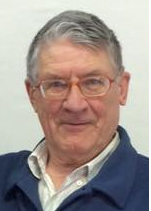
Егоров Юрий Владимирович

In 1960 he completed his undergraduate studies at the Mechanics and Mathematics Faculty of Moscow State University (MSU). In 1963 from MSU he received his Ph.D. with the thesis "Некоторые задачи теории оптимального управления в бесконечномерных пространствах" ("Some Problems of Optimal Control Theory in Infinite-Dimensional Spaces"). In 1970 from MSU he received his Russian doctorate of sciences (Doctor Nauk) with thesis: "О локальных свойствах псевдодифференциальных операторов главного типа" ("Local Properties of Pseudodifferential Operators of Principal Type"). He was employed at MSU from 1961 to 1992, and he was a full professor in the Department of Differential Equations of the Mechanics and Mathematics Faculty there from 1973 to 1992. Since 1992 he has been a professor of mathematics at Paul Sabatier University (Toulouse III).

Egorov's research deals with differential equations and applications in mathematical physics, spectral theory, and optimal control theory. In 1970 he was an Invited Speaker of the ICM in Nice.

Egorov died in Toulouse, France on 6 October 2018, at the age of 80.

== Awards ==
- 1981 — Lomonosov Memorial Prize (established in 1944) — for his series of publications on "Субэллиптические операторы и их применения к исследованию краевых задач" (Subelliptic operators and their applications to the study of boundary value problems)
- 1988 — USSR State Prize (with several co-authors) — for their series of publications (1958–1985) on "Исследования краевых задач для дифференциальных операторов и их приложения в математической физике" (Research on boundary value problems and their applications in mathematical physics)
- 1998 — Petrovsky Award (jointly with V. A. Kondratiev) for their series of publications on "Исследование спектра эллиптических операторов" (The study of the spectra of elliptic operators)

== Selected publications ==
=== Articles ===
- "The canonical transformations of pseudodifferential operators." Uspekhi Matematicheskikh Nauk 24, no. 5 (1969): 235–236.
- "On the solubility of differential equations with simple characteristics." Russian Mathematical Surveys 26, no. 2 (1971): 113.
- with Mikhail Aleksandrovich Shubin: "Linear partial differential equations. Foundations of the classical theory." Itogi Nauki i Tekhniki. Seriya" Sovremennye Problemy Matematiki. Fundamental'nye Napravleniya" 30 (1988): 5–255.
- "A contribution to the theory of generalized functions." Russian Mathematical Surveys 45, no. 5 (1990): 1.
- with Vladimir Aleksandrovich Kondrat'ev and Olga Arsen'evna Oleynik: "Asymptotic behaviour of the solutions of non-linear elliptic and parabolic systems in tube domains." Sbornik: Mathematics 189, no. 3 (1998): 359–382.
- Victor A. Galaktionov, Vladimir A. Kondratiev, and Stanislav I. Pohozaev: "On the necessary conditions of global existence to a quasilinear inequality in the half-space." Comptes Rendus de l'Académie des Sciences-Series I-Mathematics 330, no. 2 (2000): 93–98.

=== Books ===
- with Vladimir A. Kondratiev: On spectral theory of elliptic operators. Operator theory, advances and applications; vol. 89. Basel; Boston: Birkhäuser Verlag. 1996. ISBN 9783764353902; x+328 pages
- with Bert-Wolfgang Schulze: Pseudo-differential operators, singularities, applications. Operator theory, advances and applications; vol. 93. Basel; Boston: Birkhäuser Verlag. 1997. ISBN 9783764354848; xiii+349 pages
