= KE KELIT =

Austrian pipe-system manufacturer

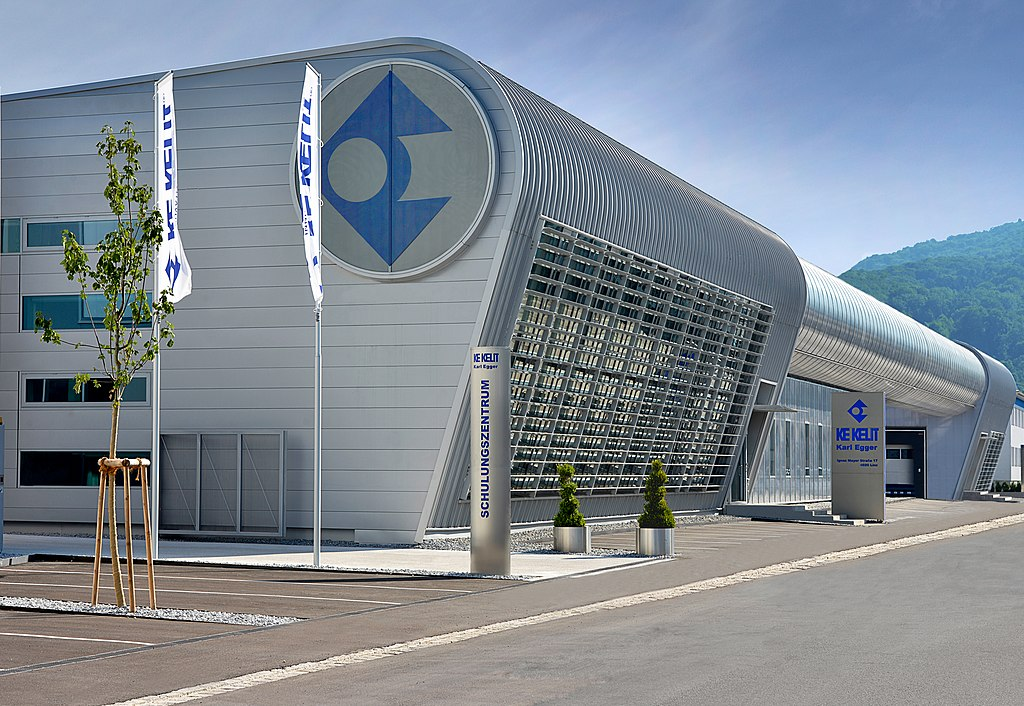
- Headquarters and production Linz
- Company type: Gmbh
- Industry: Plastics industry
- Founded: 1973
- Headquarters: Linz, Austria
- Revenue: Euro 180 Million
- Owner: Karl Egger, Kristine Egger
- Number of employees: 600
- Website: www.kekelit.com

KE KELIT is an Austrian family-owned company, founded in Linz in 1945. The company produces pipe systems made of plastic and metal, and climate control systems. The company's headquarters is located in Linz. The company employs 600 staff in 25 companies in Austria, Bavaria, Singapore, Cambodia, Myanmar, Macau, New Zealand, Romania, Slovakia, Hungary and Malaysia (Kuala Lumpur).

== History ==
KE KELIT was founded by Karl Egger in 1945 as a company for installing gas, water and heating systems. Production of plastic waste pipes began in 1960. In 1966 district heating pipes were added to the product range. KE KELIT GmbH was founded in 1973. KE KELIT was the first company to introduce CFC free pipe systems to the market in 1989.

== Products ==
The company owns 150 patents and utility models for connecting technologies, such as push-fit connections requiring no tools, or induction welding of district heating pipes.

The products are used for drinking water, heating, district heating, industrial and cooling systems. The pipe systems and prefabricated components are made of plastic, multilayer materials, stainless steel, copper, and other materials. The company is focused on streamlined push-fit and press-fit fittings, based on a plug and play concept. An example of this is the KELOX PROTEC push-fit fitting range.

The company is certified to the ISO 9001 quality management system (since 1994), the ISO 14001 environment management system (since 2013) and the ISO 50001 energy management system (since 2016). Alongside its pipe systems KE KELIT also installs cooling systems (through its company Coolfix GmbH).
