= Josef Stefan =

Carinthian Slovene physicist (1835–1893)

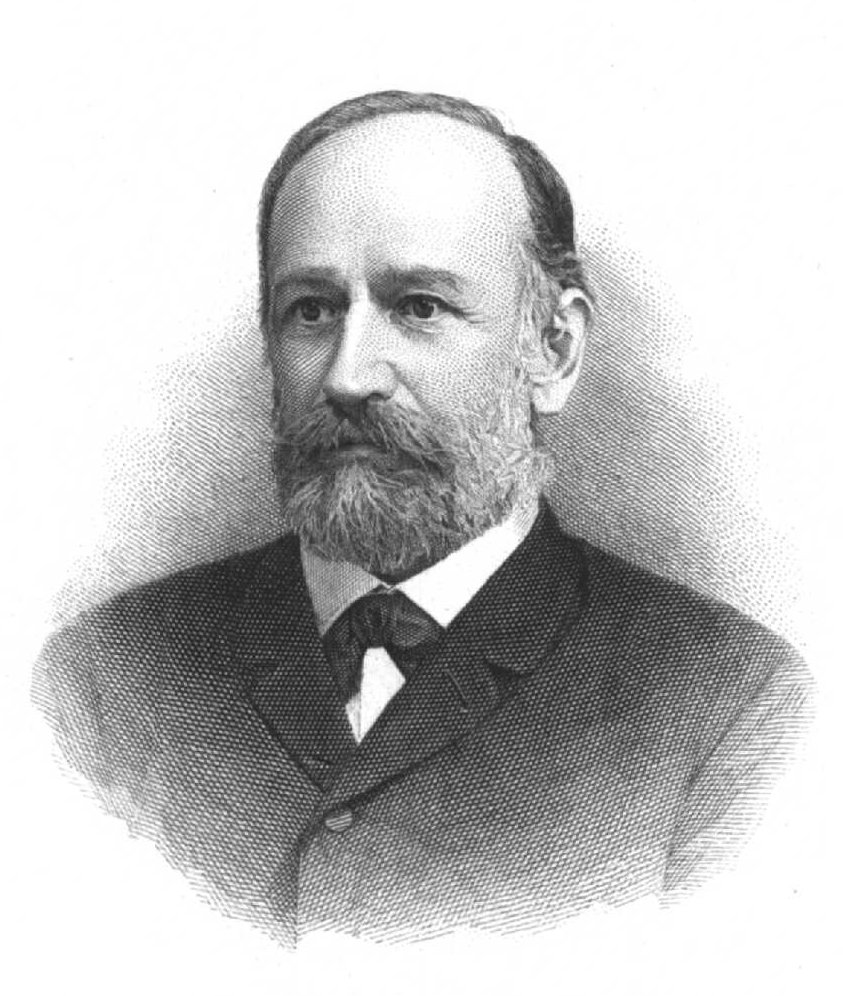
- Born: Jožef Štefan; 24 March 1835; St. Peter (today in Klagenfurt), Austrian Empire
- Died: 7 January 1893 (aged 57); Vienna, Austria-Hungary
- Education: University of Vienna
- Known for: Stefan–Boltzmann law Stefan–Boltzmann constant Stefan problem Stefan's equation Stefan's formula Stefan flow Stefan number Maxwell–Stefan diffusion Squeeze flow
- Awards: Lieben Prize (1865)
- Scientific career
- Fields: Physicist
- Workplaces: University of Vienna
- Academic advisors: Andreas von Ettingshausen
- Doctoral students: Ludwig Boltzmann; Johann Josef Loschmidt; Marian Smoluchowski

Josef Stefan (Slovene: Jožef Štefan; 24 March 1835 – 7 January 1893) was a Carinthian Slovene physicist, mathematician, and poet of the Austrian Empire.

== Life and work ==
Stefan was born in the village of St. Peter (Slovene: Sveti Peter) on the outskirts of Klagenfurt) to Aleš (Aleksander) Stefan (1805–1872) and Marija Startinik (1815–1863). His parents, both ethnic Slovenes, did not marry until Josef was eleven. The Stefans were of modest means; his father was a milling assistant and his mother served as a maidservant. Josef was their only child.

Stefan attended elementary school in Klagenfurt, where he showed talent, and was recommended for enrollment at the Klagenfurt Lyceum in 1845. At thirteen, he experienced the revolutionary year of 1848, which inspired him to show sympathy toward the Slovene literary and national movement.

After having graduated top of his class in high school, he briefly considered joining the Benedictine Order, but his great interest in physics prevailed. He left for Vienna in 1853 to study mathematics and physics. His professor of physics in the gymnasium was Karel Robida, who wrote the first Slovene physics textbook. Stefan then earned his habilitation in mathematical physics at the University of Vienna in 1858. During his student years, he also wrote and published a number of poems in Slovene.

Stefan taught physics at the University of Vienna, was Director of the Physical Institute from 1866, Vice-President of the Vienna Academy of Sciences, and member of several scientific institutions in Europe. He died in Vienna, Austria-Hungary. His life and work were extensively documented by the physicist Janez Strnad.

== Work ==
Stefan published nearly 80 scientific articles, mostly in the Bulletins of the Vienna Academy of Sciences. He is best known for originating Stefan's law in 1879, a physical power law stating that the total radiation from a black body is proportional to the fourth power of its thermodynamic temperature T:

$$j^{\star} = \sigma T^{4}$$

He derived this law from the measurements of the French physicists Dulong and Petit. As both incident radiation and blackbody emission are always equal, this equation applies equally to the temperature of any ideal body subject to incident radiation across its surface. In 1884, the law was extended to apply to grey-body emissions by Stefan's student Ludwig Boltzmann and hence is known as Stefan–Boltzmann law. Boltzmann treated a heat engine with light as a working matter. This law is the only physical law of nature named after a Slovene physicist. Today, the law is derived from Planck's law of black-body radiation:

$$j^{\star} = \int_{0}^{\infty} \left( {dj^{\star}\over d\lambda} \right) d\lambda$$

With his law, Stefan determined the temperature of the Sun's surface, which he calculated to be 5,430 °C (9,810 °F). This was the first sensible value for the temperature of the Sun.

Stefan provided the first measurements of the thermal conductivity of gases, treated evaporation, and among others studied diffusion, heat conduction in fluids. For his treatise on optics, the University of Vienna bestowed the Lieben Prize on him. Because of his early work in calculating evaporation and diffusion rates, flow from a droplet or particle that is induced by evaporation or sublimation at the surface is now called the Stefan flow.

Very important are also his electromagnetic equations, defined in vector notation, and works in the kinetic theory of heat. Stefan was among the first physicists in Europe who fully understood Maxwell's electromagnetic theory and one of the few outside England who expanded on it. He calculated inductivity of a coil with a quadratic cross-section, and he corrected Maxwell's miscalculation. He also researched a phenomenon called the skin effect, where high-frequency electric current is greater on the surface of a conductor than in its interior.

In mathematics, the Stefan problems or Stefan's tasks with movable boundary are well known. The problem was first studied by Lamé and Clapeyron in 1831. Stefan solved the problem when he was calculating how quickly a layer of ice on water grows (Stefan's equation).

== Eponymous terms ==
Several concepts in physics and mathematics are named after Joseph Stefan:

- Stefan–Boltzmann law
- Stefan–Boltzmann constant σ
- Stefan adhesion
- Stefan problem
- Stefan's equation
- Stefan's formula
- Stefan flow
- Stefan number
- Stefan tube
- Maxwell–Stefan diffusion

The Jožef Stefan Institute, Slovenia's premier scientific establishment, is also named after him, and also:

- Stefan (crater) on the Moon
