= Ivan Petrovsky =

Soviet mathematician (1901–1973)

- Иван Петровский
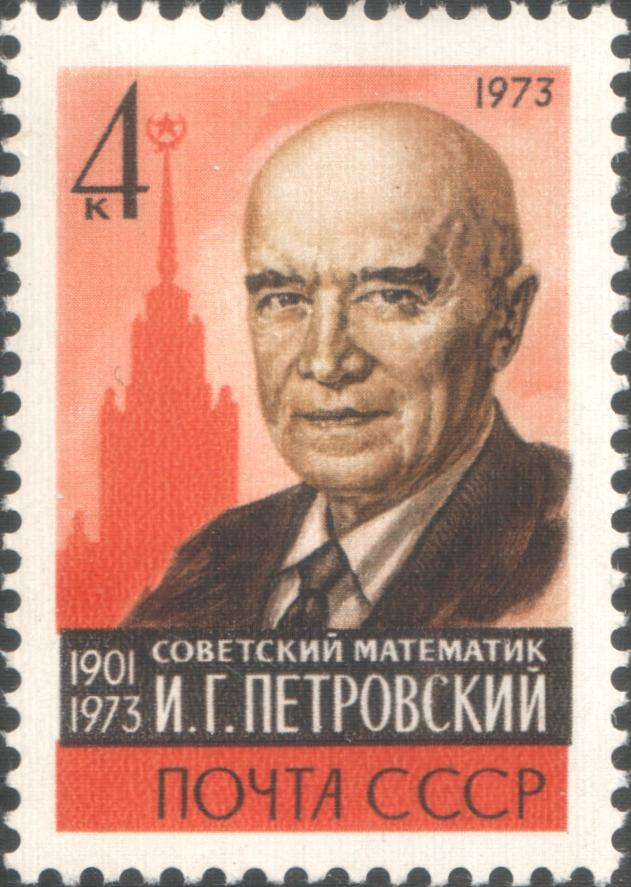
- Petrovsky on a 1973 Soviet stamp
- Born: 18 January 1901; Sevsk, Oryol Governorate, Russian Empire
- Died: 15 January 1973 (aged 71); Moscow, Russian SFSR, Soviet Union
- Education: Moscow State University
- Known for: Hyperbolic partial differential equations Kolmogorov–Petrovsky–Piskunov equation Petrovsky lacuna
- Scientific career
- Workplaces: Moscow State University; Steklov Institute of Mathematics
- Doctoral advisor: Dmitri Egorov
- Doctoral students: Olga Ladyzhenskaya; Evgenii Landis; Olga Oleinik; Sergei Godunov; Aleksei Filippov

Ivan Georgiyevich Petrovsky (Russian: Иван Георгиевич Петровский; 18 January 1901 – 15 January 1973) was a Soviet mathematician working mainly in the field of partial differential equations. He greatly contributed to the solution of Hilbert's 19th and 16th problems, and discovered what are now called Petrovsky lacunas. He also worked on the theories of boundary value problems, probability, and on the topology of algebraic curves and surfaces.

== Biography ==
Petrovsky was a student of Dmitri Egorov. Among his students were Olga Ladyzhenskaya, Evgenii Landis, Olga Oleinik and Sergei Godunov.

Petrovsky taught at Steklov Institute of Mathematics. He was a member of the Academy of Sciences of the Soviet Union since 1946 and was awarded Hero of Socialist Labour in 1969. He was the president of Moscow State University (1951–1973) and the head of the International Congress of Mathematicians (Moscow, 1966).

He died in Moscow, and was buried in the Novodevichy Cemetery.

== Selected publications ==
- Petrovsky, I. G. (1937), "Über das Cauchysche Problem für Systeme von partiellen Differentialgleichungen", Recueil Mathématique (Matematicheskii Sbornik) (in German), 2 (44) (5): 815–870, JFM 63.0466.03, Zbl 0018.40503.
- Petrovsky, I. G. (1939), "Sur l'analyticité des solutions des systèmes d'équations différentielles", Recueil Mathématique (Matematicheskii Sbornik) (in French), 5 (47) (1): 3–70, JFM 65.0405.02, MR 0001425, Zbl 0022.22601.
- Petrovsky, I. G. (1945), "On the diffusion of waves and the lacunas for hyperbolic equations", Recueil Mathématique (Matematicheskii Sbornik), 17 (59) (3): 289–368, MR 0016861, Zbl 0061.21309.
- Petrovsky, I. G. (1953), Vorlesungen über die Theorie der Integralgleichungen, Würzburg: Physica Verlag
- Petrovsky, I. G. (1954), Lectures on partial differential equations, New York: Interscience
- Petrovsky, I. G. (1954), Vorlesungen über der gewöhnlichen Differentialgleichungen, Teubner
- Petrovsky, I. G. (1957), Lectures on the theory of integral equations, Rochester: Graylock|
- Petrowsky, I. G. (1996), Oleinik, O. A. (ed.), Selected works. Part I: Systems of partial differential equations and algebraic geometry, Classics of Soviet Mathematics, vol. 5 (part 1), Amsterdam: Gordon and Breach Publishers, ISBN 978-2-88124-978-5, MR 1677652, Zbl 0948.01042.
- Petrowsky, I. G. (1996), Oleinik, O. A. (ed.), Selected works. Part II: Differential equations and probability theory, Classics of Soviet Mathematics, vol. 5 (part 2), Amsterdam: Gordon and Breach Publishers, ISBN 978-2-88124-979-2, MR 1677648, Zbl 0948.01043.
