= Petrovsky lacuna =

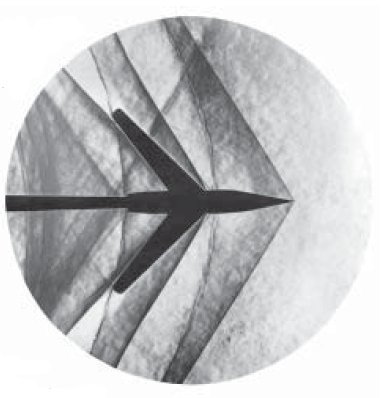
Petrovsky lacunas are similar to the spaces between shock waves of a supersonic object.

In mathematics, a Petrovsky lacuna, named for the Russian mathematician I. G. Petrovsky, is a region where the fundamental solution of a linear hyperbolic partial differential equation vanishes. They were studied by Petrovsky (1945) who found topological conditions for their existence.

Petrovsky's work was generalized and updated by Atiyah, Bott, and Gårding (1970, 1973).
