= Worbla =

Thermoplastic modelling material

Worbla is a brand of thermoplastic modelling materials, popular among cosplayers for creating costumes, armor and props. The name of the material is that of Worbla AG, a former synthetics manufacturer in Worblaufen, Switzerland, now part of the Gurit group. The material is marketed by the German company Cast4Art Vertriebsgesellschaft.

== Use ==
In order to be shaped, Worbla is warmed up, usually with a hot air gun, until it becomes formable at 90 °C (194 °F). It is then draped over formers or hand-moulded (wearing gloves) to shape. The inbuilt adhesive allows multiple layers to be laminated easily, for either strength or to add bas relief detail. A common technique for wearable props such as armour is to laminate it to thin EVA foam sheet, giving a light and slightly flexible carapace.

Worbla can also be moulded, when warmed, as a putty and used to sculpt solid pieces. Unusually, offcuts of sheet can be recycled in this way. The material can be cut with scissors, knives or by laser. When cold it can be cut, carved or sanded with woodworking hand tools. The surface is slightly rough, similar to some grades of leather, which allows textured paint effects. For a smooth surface it can be either sanded or filled with a primer paint.

Cosplayers and prop makers have widely adopted Worbla for its light weight, and easy working with minimal tools.

== Varieties and properties ==
Worbla is made in several varieties:

- Finest Art: The original "Worbla", a sheet material composed of a thermoplastic resin and wood flour filler. Standard sheets are around 1 millimetre (0.039 in) thick. The sheet is coated on one side with a heat-activated adhesive.
- Flame Red Art: Similar to the original, but with a flame retardant component, for "locations where safety is of the utmost importance".
- TranspArt: A transparent polymer thermoplastic that becomes formable at 120 °C (248 °F).
- Black: This product has a smoother surface, similar to EVA foam, and is designed to be painted with less filling and sanding needed. It is also workable at 90 °C.
- Worbla’s KobraCast Art: which initially resembles knitted plastic sheeting, is heat activated (approx. 80–90 °C; 176–194 °F) and can be shaped by hand, in a mold, or vacuformed. KobraCast Art contains a very strong adhesive, with a very stretchable, but tear-resistant mesh inside. Named after Kobracast see below.

== Similar materials ==
- Cosplayflex, a thermoplastic material from Germany.
- Sintra, more durable and stiffer
- Kydex, a robust thermoplastic, less commonly used for props, but often for firearm holsters, and sheaths for knives.
