= Implant induction welding of thermoplastics =

Plastic manufacturing joining method

Implant induction welding is a joining method used in plastic manufacturing. The welding process uses an induction coil to excite and heat electromagnetically susceptible material at the joint interface and melt the thermoplastic. The susceptible material can be contained in a gasket placed between the welding surface, or within the actual components of a composite material. Its usage is common for large, unusually shaped, or delicate parts that would be difficult to weld through other methods.

== Physical mechanisms ==
In non-magnetic electrical conductors like aluminum, nickel, or copper, an alternating electromagnetic field will induce Eddy currents in the material. These currents generate thermal energy through Joule heating. Ferromagnetic materials like iron and carbon steels will see heating from both Eddy current formation and hysteresis losses.

== Welding process ==
=== Material considerations ===
Induction heating is an efficient method of heating electrically conductive or magnetic materials. Warm-up times are minimal and direct contact with the part is not needed. Unfortunately most thermoplastics are non-magnetic and excellent insulators. To take advantage of induction heating for thermoplastic welding purposes, a susceptible implant must be used as an intermediary material. Nearly any electrical conductor or ferromagnetic material may be used as an implant. Implant styles include meshes, fibers, and fine powders. The most common gasket design is a thermoplastic composite with suspended susceptible fibers. This composite gasket can be formed into any shape required for the welding application. The gasket matrix is typically made of the same thermoplastic being welded. In situations where two dissimilar materials are to be welded, the gasket material is usually a blend of the two thermoplastics.

==== Composite materials ====
Carbon fiber is of interest due to its widespread use in composite materials. Provided there are closed loops of carbon within the composite structure, eddy currents can be induced in the material. Unidirectional carbon fiber composites can have poor susceptibility when fiber to fiber contact is limited.

Focusing heat only at the weld point is difficult with susceptible composite fibers throughout the material. In carbon fiber composites, thin electrically insulating layers with non-aligned fibers may be inserted between conducting layers to electrically isolate the joint surface from the material bulk. Using this technique, induction heating of the bulk is avoided.

=== Equipment ===
An induction generator is used to produce high frequency current in the range of 2 to 10 MHz. The range used is regulated by the FCC to avoid interference with broadcast signals.

An induction coil converts the high frequency current from the induction generator into the necessary alternating magnetic field. A single turn coil may be used when space is limited, however multiturn coil designs are more common due to their generation of a stronger and deeper penetrating magnetic field. Split coil designs are also available, which may be disassembled to fully surround a large part such as plastic piping. The high currents used in induction welding produce large amounts of heat in the coil. To avoid overheating, the coil turns are made with hollow tubing, and water is circulated during welding. Coil heat is dissipated by an attached heat exchanger.

Fixtures are used to hold the parts in position during welding. One fixture is fixed and the other moveable so that a press may apply and maintain pressure during heating and cooling.

=== Welding steps ===
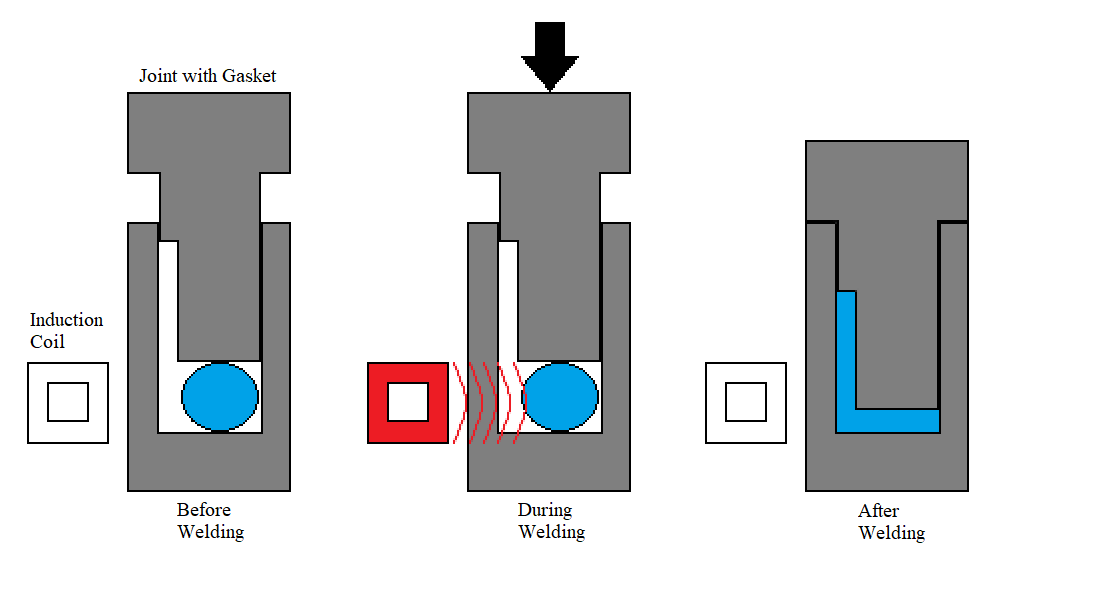
Steps of implant induction welding in a tongue in groove joint.

An implant rich gasket is placed at the surface to be welded. Pressure is applied to the joint to force out air cavities and ensure a sound bond. An electromagnetic field is applied by the induction coil to heat the implants, and pressure is applied to the joint. Heat conducts into the surrounding thermoplastic, which melts the gasket and creates a melt layer at the joint surfaces. The applied pressure flows the molten thermoplastic and fills the joint. When sufficient bonding has been achieved, the induction coil is turned off and the joint is cooled under pressure. For large items with long joints, the joint can be welded continuously by scanning the active coil along the length of the interface.

=== Parameters ===
==== Power ====
Typical induction generators provide a power output of 1 to 5 kW. High power output is necessary for longer and larger joints. Power output must also be increased as coil distance from the joint increases, due to electromagnetic field decay.

==== Pressure ====
Even distribution of the molten polymer in the joint is imperative for strong bonding. Weld pressure must be sufficient to induce squeeze flow in the molten gasket, achieve intimate contact with the joint surface, and fill the joint.

==== Weld time and cooling time ====
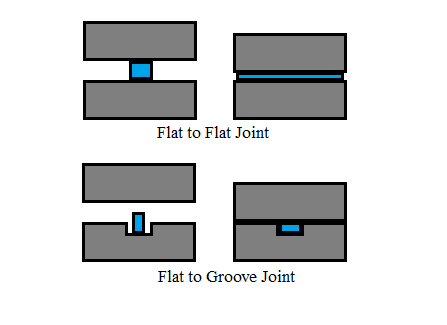
A flat to flat and flat to groove joint used in implant induction welding.

Weld time will vary based on the joint size, the volume of susceptible implant material, and the power and frequency. Cycle times can be very fast since no preheating is needed, and heat generation happens exclusively at the weld joint. This also benefits the cooling time. With little heat wasted on the bulk of the part, cooling is brief. Under 1 second for some applications.

=== Joint design ===
Unusual joint designs are possible using implant induction welding. The simplest is the flat to flat joint, where a gasket is placed between two thermoplastic plates. This joint is common for continuous welding processes, or long weld lines where the active coil is scanned along the joint interface. The flat to groove joint uses a plate with a channel to accurately align the weld versus the flat to flat joint. The tongue in groove joint is similar to the flat to groove joint, but has the advantage of complete encapsulation of the gasket and a pressure tight seal.

== Applications ==
=== Food packaging ===
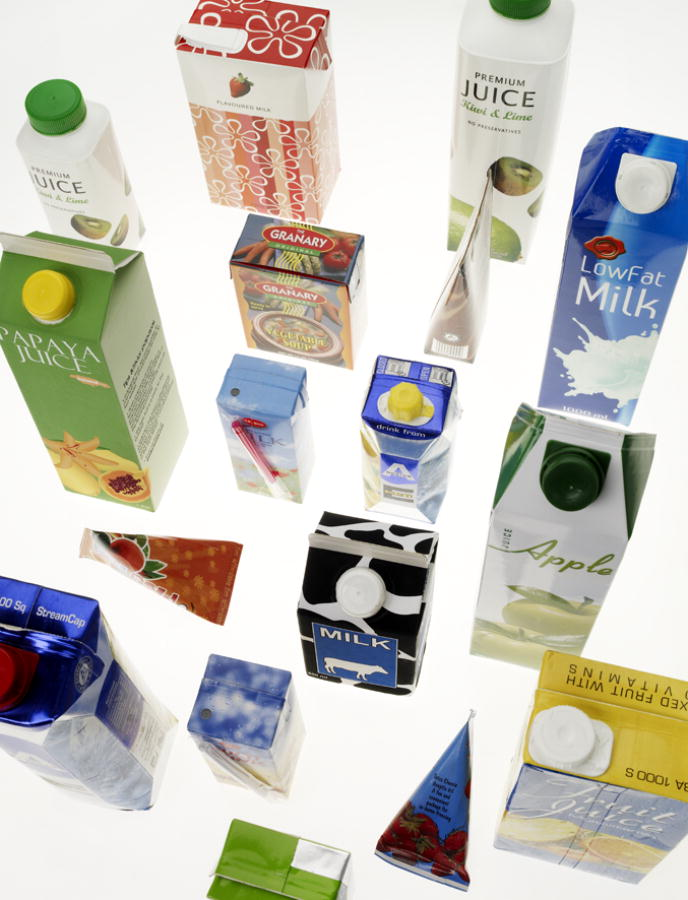
Tetra Pak containers sealed by implant induction welding

Implant induction welding is heavily used in the production of Tetra Pak containers for products like juice boxes. The use of induction heating shortens the sealing time versus other joining methods that use external heat, and avoids damage to the paperboard layer from direct contact with hot tooling. An aluminum foil layer is used to block oxygen diffusion into the packaging, so no additional implant material is needed.

=== Automotive manufacturing ===
The automotive industry makes large scale use of implant induction welding for the manufacture of large plastic items such as bumpers, plastic body panels, and fuel tanks. Manufacturing costs of components with complex geometries are brought down by manufacturing the parts in separate pieces, to be assembled later using induction welding.

=== Tamper-proof packaging ===
Polyethylene coated aluminum foil is induction welded to the top of many food, supplement, and drug containers. The seal helps retain product quality and provides evidence of tampering.

== Advantages and disadvantages ==
=== Advantages ===
- Implant induction welding does not require physical contact with a heat source, so it is useful for joining components with unusual dimensions or delicate surfaces.
- The induction coil can be moved continuously to heat the entire surface of long joints. Extremely large parts can be effectively welded using this method.
- Heat generation is limited to the exact area where it is required for joining, so thermal stress generated by welding is low.
- The joint can be reopened using induction heating for repairs or recycling.
- The heating and joining steps are simultaneous, so cycle times are short.

=== Disadvantages ===
- There are additional costs due to the implant and gasket material. Custom tooling may also be required for some part designs. This can make the method cost prohibitive for small and simple items.
- Heating is limited by the penetration depth of the electromagnetic field. Care must be taken to avoid uneven heating in complex joint designs.
- Implant material at the joint can have an impact on strength.
- The electromagnetic field may affect metallic or electronic components of the part.
