= Stefan number =

Ratio of sensible heat to latent heat

The Stefan number (St or Ste) is defined as the ratio of sensible heat to latent heat. It is given by the formula

$\mathrm{Ste} = \frac{c_p \Delta T}{L},$

where

- c_{p} is the specific heat,
  - c_{p} is the specific heat of solid phase in the freezing process while c_{p} is the specific heat of liquid phase in the melting process.
- ∆T is the temperature difference between phases,
- L is the latent heat of melting.

It is a dimensionless parameter that is useful in analyzing a Stefan problem. The parameter was developed from Josef Stefan's calculations of the rate of phase change of water into ice on the polar ice caps and coined by G.S.H. Lock in 1969. The problems origination is fully described by Vuik and further commentary on its place in Josef Stefan's larger career can be found in Same number exist for vapor to liquid phase change, Nombre de Jakob.
