= Stefan's equation =

In glaciology and civil engineering, Stefan's equation (or Stefan's formula) describes the dependence of ice-cover thickness on the temperature history. It says in particular that the expected ice accretion is proportional to the square root of the number of degree days below freezing. It is named for Slovenian physicist Josef Stefan.

== See also ==
- Stefan problem

=== References ===
- Dean R. Freitag; Terry T. McFadden (1997). Introduction to Cold Regions Engineering. ASCE Publications. pp. 166–169. ISBN 0-7844-0006-7.
- Stefan's formula in the McGraw-Hill Dictionary of Scientific and Technical Terms at Answers.com (archived)
