= Induction welding =

Welding using electromagnetic induction

Induction welding is a form of welding that uses electromagnetic induction to heat the workpiece. The welding apparatus contains an induction coil that is energised with a radio-frequency electric current. This generates a high-frequency electromagnetic field that acts on either an electrically conductive or a ferromagnetic workpiece. In an electrically conductive workpiece, the main heating effect is resistive heating, which is due to induced currents called eddy currents. In a ferromagnetic workpiece, the heating is caused mainly by hysteresis, as the electromagnetic field repeatedly distorts the magnetic domains of the ferromagnetic material. In practice, most materials undergo a combination of these two effects.

Nonmagnetic materials and electrical insulators such as plastics can be induction-welded by implanting them with metallic or ferromagnetic compounds, called susceptors, that absorb the electromagnetic energy from the induction coil, become hot, and lose their heat to the surrounding material by thermal conduction. Plastic can also be induction welded by embedding the plastic with electrically conductive fibers like metals or carbon fiber. Induced eddy currents resistively heat the embedded fibers which lose their heat to the surrounding plastic by conduction. Induction welding of carbon fiber reinforced plastics is commonly used in the aerospace industry.

Induction welding is used for long production runs and is a highly automated process, usually used for welding the seams of pipes. It can be a very fast process, as a lot of power can be transferred to a localised area, so the faying surfaces melt very quickly and can be pressed together to form a continuous rolling weld.

The depth that the currents, and therefore heating, penetrates from the surface is inversely proportional to the square root of the frequency. The temperature of the metals being welded and their composition will also affect the penetration depth. This process is very similar to resistance welding, except that in the case of resistance welding the current is delivered using contacts to the workpiece instead of using induction.

Induction welding was first discovered by Michael Faraday. The basics of induction welding explain that the magnetic field's direction is dependent on the direction of current flow. and the field's direction will change at the same rate as the current's frequency. For example, a 60 Hz AC current will cause the field to change directions 120 times a second. This concept is known as Faraday's Law.

When induction welding takes place, the work pieces heat up to under the melting temperature and the edges of the pieces are placed together impurities get forced out to give a solid forge weld.

Induction welding is used for joining a multitude of thermoplastics and thermosetting matrix composites. The apparatus used for induction welding processes includes a radio frequency power generator, a heating station, the work piece material, and a cooling system.

The power generator comes in either the form of solid state or vacuum tube and is used to provide an alternating current of 230-340 V or a frequency of 50–60 Hz to the system. This value is determined by what induction coil is used with the piece.

The heat station utilizes a capacitor and a coil to heat the work pieces. The capacitor matches the power generators output and the induction coil transfers energy to the piece. When welding the coil needs to be close to the work piece to maximize the energy transfer and the work piece used during induction welding is an important key component of optimal efficiency.

Some equations to consider for induction welding include:

Thermal calculation: $\bar{Q}(x, t)= {\eta(J_0^2)\rho \over C_r}$

Where: $C_r$ is thermal mass

$\rho$ is resistivity

$\eta$ is efficiency

$J_0$ is surface density

Newton Cooling Equation: $q^n=h(T_s-T_B)$

Where: $q^n$ is heat flux density

h is the heat transfer coefficient

$T_s$ is the temperature of the work piece surface

$T_B$ is the temperature of the surrounding air

== See also ==
- Induction heating
- Implant induction welding of thermoplastics
