= Olga Oleinik =

Russian mathematician

Olga Arsenievna Oleinik
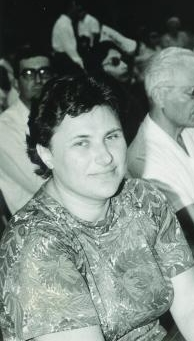
- Olga Arsenievna Oleinik in Nice, 1970
- Born: 2 July 1925; Matusiv, Shpola Raion, Ukrainian SSR, Soviet Union
- Died: 13 October 2001 (aged 76); Moscow, Russia
- Education: Moscow State University, 1954 (PhD)
- Known for: Theory of elasticity, partial differential equations, boundary layer theory, weak solutions of nonlinear differential equations
- Awards: 1952 Chebotarev Prize, 1988 USSR State Prize, 1995 Petrowsky Prize, Prize of the Russian Academy of Sciences
- Scientific career
- Fields: Mathematics
- Workplaces: Moscow State University
- Doctoral advisor: Ivan Petrovsky

Olga Arsenievna Oleinik (also as Oleĭnik) HFRSE (Russian: О́льга Арсе́ньевна Оле́йник) (2 July 1925 – 13 October 2001) was a Soviet mathematician who conducted pioneering work on the theory of partial differential equations, the theory of strongly inhomogeneous elastic media, and the mathematical theory of boundary layers. She was a student of Ivan Petrovsky. She studied and worked at the Moscow State University.

She received many prizes for her remarkable contributions: the Chebotarev Prize in 1952; the State Prize 1988; the Petrowsky Prize in 1995; and the Prize of the Russian Academy of Sciences in 1995. Also she was member of several foreign academies of sciences, and earned several honorary degrees.

== Life ==
On 2 May 1985 Olga Oleinik was awarded the laurea honoris causa by the Sapienza University of Rome, jointly with Fritz John.

== Work ==
=== Research activity ===
She authored more than 370 mathematical publications and 8 monographs, as the sole author or in collaboration with others: her work covers algebraic geometry, the theory of partial differential equations where her work enlightened various aspects, elasticity theory and boundary layers theory.

=== Teaching activity ===
She was a very active teacher, advising the thesis of 57 "candidates".

== Selected publications of Olga Oleinik ==
- Oleinik, Olga A. (1957), "Discontinuous solutions of non-linear differential equations", Uspekhi Matematicheskikh Nauk (in Russian), 12 (3(75)): 3–73, MR 0094541, Zbl 0080.07701. An important paper where the author describes generalized solutions of nonlinear partial differential equations as BV functions.
- Oleinik, Olga A. (1959), "Construction of a generalized solution of the Cauchy problem for a quasi-linear equation of first order by the introduction of "vanishing viscosity"", Uspekhi Matematicheskikh Nauk (in Russian), 14 (2(86)): 159–164, MR 0117426, Zbl 0096.06603. An important paper where the author constructs a weak solution in BV for a nonlinear partial differential equation with the method of vanishing viscosity.
- Oleinik, O. A. (1960), "A method of solution of the general Stefan problem", Doklady Akademii Nauk SSSR (in Russian), 135: 1050–1057, MR 0125341, Zbl 0131.09202. An important paper in the theory of the Stefan problem: generalizing earlier work of her doctoral student S. L. Kamenomostskaya, the author proves the existence of a generalized solution for the multi dimensional model.
- Oleinik, Olga A.; Radkevich, Evgenii V. (1973), Second order equations with nonnegative characteristic form, New York and London / Providence, R.I.: Plenum Press / AMS, pp. vii+259, ISBN 0-306-30751-0, MR 0457907, Zbl 0217.41502 (reviews of the Russian edition).
- Oleinik, Olga Arsenievna; Kondratiev, Vladimir Alexandrovitch (1989), "On Korn's inequalities", Comptes rendus hebdomadaires des séances de l'Académie des Sciences, Série I: Mathématiques, 308 (16): 483–487, MR 0995908, Zbl 0698.35067.
- Cioranescu, Doina; Oleinik, Olga Arsenievna; Tronel, Gérard (1989), "On Korn's inequalities for frame type structures and junctions", Comptes rendus hebdomadaires des séances de l'Académie des Sciences, Série I: Mathématiques, 309 (9): 591–596, MR 1053284, Zbl 0937.35502.
- Oleinik, O. A.; Shamaev, A. S.; Yosifian, G. A. (1991), Mathematical problems in elasticity and homogenization, Studies in Mathematics and its Applications, vol. 26, Amsterdam – London – New York – Tokyo: North-Holland, pp. xiv+398, ISBN 0-444-88441-6, MR 1195131, Zbl 0768.73003.
- Oleinik, Olga A. (1992), "Korn's Type inequalities and applications to elasticity", in Amaldi, E.; Amerio, L.; Fichera, G.; Gregory, T.; Grioli, G.; Martinelli, E.; Montalenti, G.; Pignedoli, A.; Salvini, Giorgio; Scorza Dragoni, Giuseppe (eds.), Convegno internazionale in memoria di Vito Volterra (8–11 ottobre 1990), Atti dei Convegni Lincei (in Italian), vol. 92, Roma: Accademia Nazionale dei Lincei, pp. 183–209, ISSN 0391-805X, MR 1783034, Zbl 0972.35013, archived from the original on 7 January 2017.
- Kozlov, S. M.; Oleinik, O. A.; Zhikov, V. V. (1994), Homogenization of differential operators and integral functionals, Berlin-Heidelberg-New York: Springer-Verlag, pp. xii+570, doi:10.1007/978-3-642-84659-5, ISBN 3-540-54809-2, MR 1329546, Zbl 0838.35001.
- Oleinik, O. A.; Samokhin, V. N. (1999), Mathematical models in boundary layer theory, Applied Mathematics and Mathematical Computation, vol. 15, London-Weinheim-New York-Tokyo-Melbourne-Madras: Chapman & Hall/CRC Press, pp. x+516, ISBN 1-58488-015-5, MR 1697762, Zbl 0928.76002.

== See also ==
- Boundary layer
- Bounded variation
- Elasticity theory
- Homogenization
- Partial differential equations
- Stefan problem
- Weak solutions
