= Stefan's formula =

In thermodynamics, Stefan's formula says that the specific surface energy at a given interface is determined by the respective enthalpy difference $\Delta H^*$. $\sigma = \gamma_0 \left( \frac{\Delta H^*}{N_\text{A}^{1/3}V_\text{m}^{2/3}}\right),$ where σ is the specific surface energy, N_{A} is the Avogadro constant, $\gamma_0$ is a steric dimensionless coefficient, and V_{m} is the molar volume.
