= Maxwell–Stefan diffusion =

Model for describing diffusion

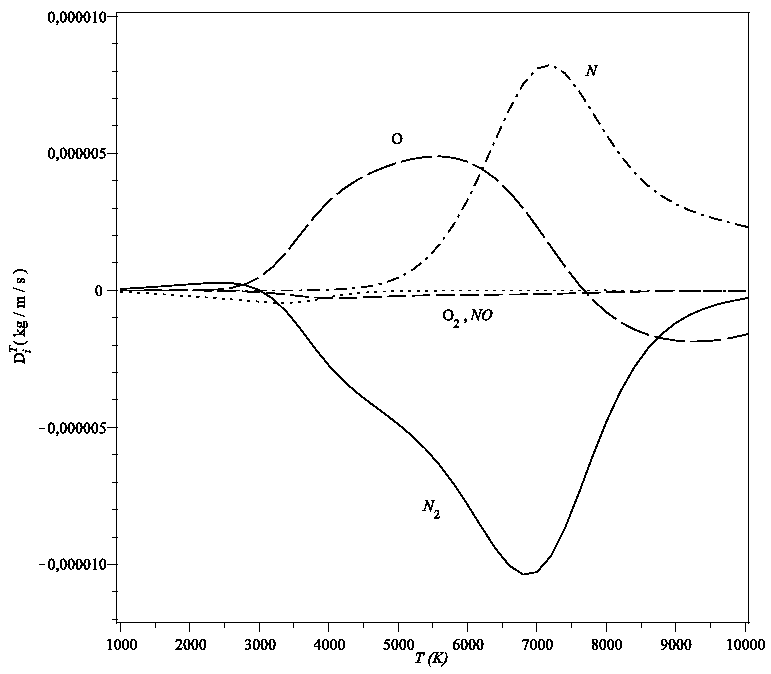
Thermal diffusion coefficients vs. temperature, for air at normal pressure

The Maxwell–Stefan diffusion (or Stefan–Maxwell diffusion) is a model for describing diffusion in multicomponent systems. The equations that describe these transport processes have been developed independently and in parallel by James Clerk Maxwell for dilute gases and Josef Stefan for liquids. The Maxwell–Stefan equation is

$$\frac{\nabla \mu_i}{R\,T}
= \frac{\nabla a_i}{a_i}
= \sum_{j=1\atop j\neq i}^{n}{\frac{\chi_j}{\mathfrak{D}_{ij}}(\vec v_j-\vec v_i)}
= \sum_{j=1\atop j\neq i}^{n}{\frac{c_j}{c\mathfrak{D}_{ij}}\left(\frac{\vec j_j}{\rho_j}-\frac{\vec j_i}{\rho_i}\right)}$$

- ∇: vector differential operator
- χ: Mole fraction
- μ: Chemical potential
- a: Activity
- i, j: Indexes for component i and j
- n: Number of components
- $\mathfrak{D}_{ij}$: Maxwell–Stefan-diffusion coefficient
- $\vec v_i$: Diffusion velocity of component i
- $c_i$: Molar concentration of component i
- $\rho_i$: Mass concentration of component i
- c: Total molar concentration
- $\vec j_i$: Mass flux of component i

The equation assumes steady state, i.e., the neglect of time derivatives in the velocity.

The basic assumption of the theory is that a deviation from equilibrium between the molecular friction and thermodynamic interactions leads to the diffusion flux. The molecular friction between two components is proportional to their difference in speed and their mole fractions. In the simplest case, the gradient of chemical potential is the driving force of diffusion. For complex systems, such as electrolytic solutions, and other drivers, such as a pressure gradient, the equation must be expanded to include additional terms for interactions.

A major disadvantage of the Maxwell–Stefan theory is that the diffusion coefficients, with the exception of the diffusion of dilute gases, do not correspond to the Fick's diffusion coefficients and are therefore not tabulated. Only the diffusion coefficients for the binary and ternary case can be determined with reasonable effort. The Maxwell-Stefan diffusion coefficients can be, for example, estimated using the empirical Vignes correlation model or the physically-motivated entropy scaling. In a multicomponent system, a set of approximate formulas exist to predict the Maxwell–Stefan-diffusion coefficient.

The Maxwell–Stefan theory is more comprehensive than the "classical" Fick's diffusion theory, as the former does not exclude the possibility of negative diffusion coefficients. It is possible to derive Fick's theory from the Maxwell–Stefan theory.

== See also ==
- Advanced Simulation Library
- Pervaporation
