= Shoshana Kamin =

Israeli mathematician

- שושנה קמין
- Born: December 24, 1930 (age 95); Moscow, RSFSR, Soviet Union
- Education: Moscow University
- Known for: Stefan problem; Partial differential equations; Elliptic differential equations; Parabolic partial differential equations
- Scientific career
- Workplaces: Moscow University; Tel Aviv University
- Doctoral advisor: Olga Arsenievna Oleinik

Shoshana Kamin (Russian: Шошана Камин, Hebrew: שושנה קמין) (born December 24, 1930), born Susanna L'vovna Kamenomostskaya (Russian: Сусанна Львовна Каменомостская), is a Soviet-born Israeli mathematician, working on the theory of parabolic partial differential equations and related mathematical physics problems.

== Biography ==
Shoshana Kamin graduated from Moscow University in 1953 and earned her "candidate of science" degree from the same university in 1959, under the supervision of Olga Oleinik. She and her two sons left the Soviet Union in the early 1971. After that she became a professor in Tel Aviv University, where she is now professor emeritus.

== Contributions ==
In the late 1950s, she gave the first proof of the existence and uniqueness of the generalized solution of the three-dimensional Stefan problem. Her proof was generalised by Oleinik.

Later, she made important contributions to the study of the porous medium equation,

$$\partial_t u = \Delta_x u^m, \,\, m > 1,$$

and to non-linear elliptic equations.

== Selected publications ==
- Kamenomostskaya, S. L. (1958), "On Stefan Problem", Nauchnye Doklady Vysshey Shkoly, Fiziko-Matematicheskie Nauki (in Russian), 1 (1): 60–62, Zbl 0143.13901. The earlier account of the research of Shoshana Kamin on the Stefan problem.
- Kamenomostskaya, S. L. (1961), "On Stefan's problem", Matematicheskii Sbornik (in Russian), 53(95) (4): 489–514, MR 0141895, Zbl 0102.09301. In this paper and in the paper (Oleinik 1960), the first existence and uniqueness proofs for the generalized solution of the three-dimensional Stefan problem are given.
- Kamenomostskaya, S. L. (March 1973), "The asymptotic behaviour of the solution of the filtration equation", Israel Journal of Mathematics, 14 (1): 76–87, doi:10.1007/BF02761536, MR 0315292, S2CID 123473787, Zbl 0254.35054.
- Kamin, S. (June 1976), "Similar solutions and the asymptotics of filtration equations", Archive for Rational Mechanics and Analysis, 60 (2): 171–183, Bibcode:1976ArRMA..60..171K, doi:10.1007/BF00250678, MR 0397202, S2CID 119703906, Zbl 0336.76036. According to Vázquez (2007, p. 15) this is one of the most important papers in the asymptotic theory of the porous medium equation. Also, perhaps for the last time ever, she signed this work with both her present and former surnames, precisely writing "S. Kamin (Kamenomostskaya)".

== See also ==
- Parabolic partial differential equation
- Refusenik
