= Stefan problem =

Concept in mathematics

In mathematics and its applications, particularly to phase transitions in matter, a Stefan problem is a particular kind of boundary value problem for a system of partial differential equations (PDE), in which the boundary between the phases can move with time. The classical Stefan problem aims to describe the evolution of the boundary between two phases of a material undergoing a phase change, for example the melting of a solid, such as ice to water. This is accomplished by solving heat equations in both regions, subject to given boundary and initial conditions. At the interface between the phases (in the classical problem) the temperature is set to the phase change temperature. To close the mathematical system a further equation, the Stefan condition, is required. This is an energy balance which defines the position of the moving interface. Note that this evolving boundary is an unknown (hyper-)surface; hence, Stefan problems are examples of free boundary problems.

Analogous problems occur, for example, in the study of porous media flow, mathematical finance and crystal growth from monomer solutions.

== Historical note ==
The problem is named after Josef Stefan (Jožef Stefan), the Slovenian physicist who introduced the general class of such problems around 1890 in a series of four papers concerning the freezing of the ground and the formation of sea ice. However, some 60 years earlier, in 1831, an equivalent problem, concerning the formation of the Earth's crust, had been studied by Lamé and Clapeyron. Stefan's problem admits a similarity solution, this is often termed the Neumann solution, which was allegedly presented in a series of lectures in the early 1860s.

A comprehensive description of the history of Stefan problems may be found in Rubinstein.

== Premises to the mathematical description ==
From a mathematical point of view, the phases are merely regions in which the solutions of the underlying PDE are continuous and differentiable up to the order of the PDE. In physical problems such solutions represent properties of the medium for each phase. The moving boundaries (or interfaces) are infinitesimally thin surfaces that separate adjacent phases; therefore, the solutions of the underlying PDE and its derivatives may suffer discontinuities across interfaces.

The underlying PDEs are not valid at the phase change interfaces; therefore, an additional condition—the Stefan condition—is needed to obtain closure. The Stefan condition expresses the local velocity of a moving boundary, as a function of quantities evaluated at either side of the phase boundary, and is usually derived from a physical constraint. In problems of heat transfer with phase change, for instance, conservation of energy dictates that the discontinuity of heat flux at the boundary must be accounted for by the rate of latent heat release (which is proportional to the local velocity of the interface).

The regularity of the equation has been studied mainly by Luis Caffarelli and further refined by work of Alessio Figalli, Xavier Ros-Oton and Joaquim Serra

== Mathematical formulation ==
=== The one-dimensional one-phase Stefan problem ===
The one-phase Stefan problem is based on an assumption that one of the material phases may be neglected. Typically this is achieved by assuming that a phase is at the phase change temperature and hence any variation from this leads to a change of phase. This is a mathematically convenient approximation, which simplifies analysis whilst still demonstrating the essential ideas behind the process. A further standard simplification is to work in non-dimensional format, such that the temperature at the interface may be set to zero and far-field values to $+1$ or $-1$.

Consider a semi-infinite one-dimensional block of ice initially at melting temperature $u=0$ for $x \in [0;+\infty)$. The most well-known form of Stefan problem involves melting via an imposed constant temperature at the left hand boundary, leaving a region $[0;s(t)]$ occupied by water. The melted depth, denoted by $s(t)$, is an unknown function of time. The Stefan problem is defined by

- The heat equation: $\frac{\partial u}{\partial t} = \frac{\partial^2 u}{\partial x^2}, \quad \forall (x,t) \in [0;s(t)] \times [0;+\infty]$
- A fixed temperature, above the melt temperature, on the left boundary: $u(0,t) = 1, \quad \forall t > 0$
- The interface at the melting temperature is set to $u \left(s(t),t \right) = 0$
- The Stefan condition: $\beta \frac{\mathrm{d}}{\mathrm{d}t} s(t) = -\frac{\partial}{\partial x} u \left(s(t), t \right)$ where $\beta$ is the Stefan number, the ratio of latent to specific sensible heat (where specific indicates it is divided by the mass). Note this definition follows naturally from the nondimensionalisation and is used in many texts however it may also be defined as the inverse of this.
- The initial temperature distribution: $u(x,0) = 0, \; \forall x \geq 0$
- The initial depth of the melted ice block: $s(0) = 0$
The Neumann solution, obtained by using self-similar variables, indicates that the position of the boundary is given by $s(t) = 2 \lambda \sqrt{\alpha t}$ where $\alpha$ is diffusivity, and $\lambda$ satisfies the transcendental equation
$$\beta \lambda = \frac{1}{\sqrt{\pi}}\frac{\mathrm{e}^{-\lambda^2}}{\text{erf}(\lambda)}.$$
The temperature in the liquid is then given by
$$T=1-\frac{\text{erf}\left(\frac{x}{2\sqrt{t}}\right)}{\text{erf}(\lambda)}.$$

== Applications ==
Apart from modelling melting of solids, Stefan problem is also used as a model for the asymptotic behaviour (in time) of more complex problems. For example, Pego uses matched asymptotic expansions to prove that Cahn-Hilliard solutions for phase separation problems behave as solutions to a non-linear Stefan problem at an intermediate time scale. Additionally, the solution of the Cahn–Hilliard equation for a binary mixture is reasonably comparable with the solution of a Stefan problem. In this comparison, the Stefan problem was solved using a front-tracking, moving-mesh method with homogeneous Neumann boundary conditions at the outer boundary. Also, Stefan problems can be applied to describe phase transformations other than solid-fluid or fluid-fluid.

Application of Stefan problem to metal crystallization in electrochemical deposition of metal powders was envisaged by Călușaru

The Stefan problem also has a rich inverse theory; in such problems, the melting depth (or curve or hyper-surface) s is the known datum and the problem is to find u or f.

== Advanced forms of Stefan problem ==
The classical Stefan problem deals with stationary materials with constant thermophysical properties (usually irrespective of phase), a constant phase change temperature and, in the example above, an instantaneous switch from the initial temperature to a distinct value at the boundary. In practice thermal properties may vary and specifically always do when the phase changes. The jump in density at phase change induces a fluid motion: the resultant kinetic energy does not figure in the standard energy balance. With an instantaneous temperature switch the initial fluid velocity is infinite, resulting in an initial infinite kinetic energy. In fact the liquid layer is often in motion, thus requiring advection or convection terms in the heat equation. The melt temperature may vary with size, curvature or speed of the interface. It is impossible to instantaneously switch temperatures and then difficult to maintain an exact fixed boundary temperature. Further, at the nanoscale the temperature may not even follow Fourier's law.

A number of these issues have been tackled in recent years for a variety of physical applications. In the solidification of supercooled melts an analysis where the phase change temperature depends on the interface velocity may be found in Font et al. Nanoscale solidification, with variable phase change temperature and energy/density effects are modelled in. Solidification with flow in a channel has been studied, in the context of lava and microchannels, or with a free surface in the context of water freezing over an ice layer. A general model including different properties in each phase, variable phase change temperature and heat equations based on either Fourier's law or the Guyer-Krumhansl equation is analysed in.

== See also ==
- Free boundary problem
- Olga Oleinik
- Shoshana Kamin
- Stefan's equation
