= Pipeline =

Pumping fluids or gas through pipes

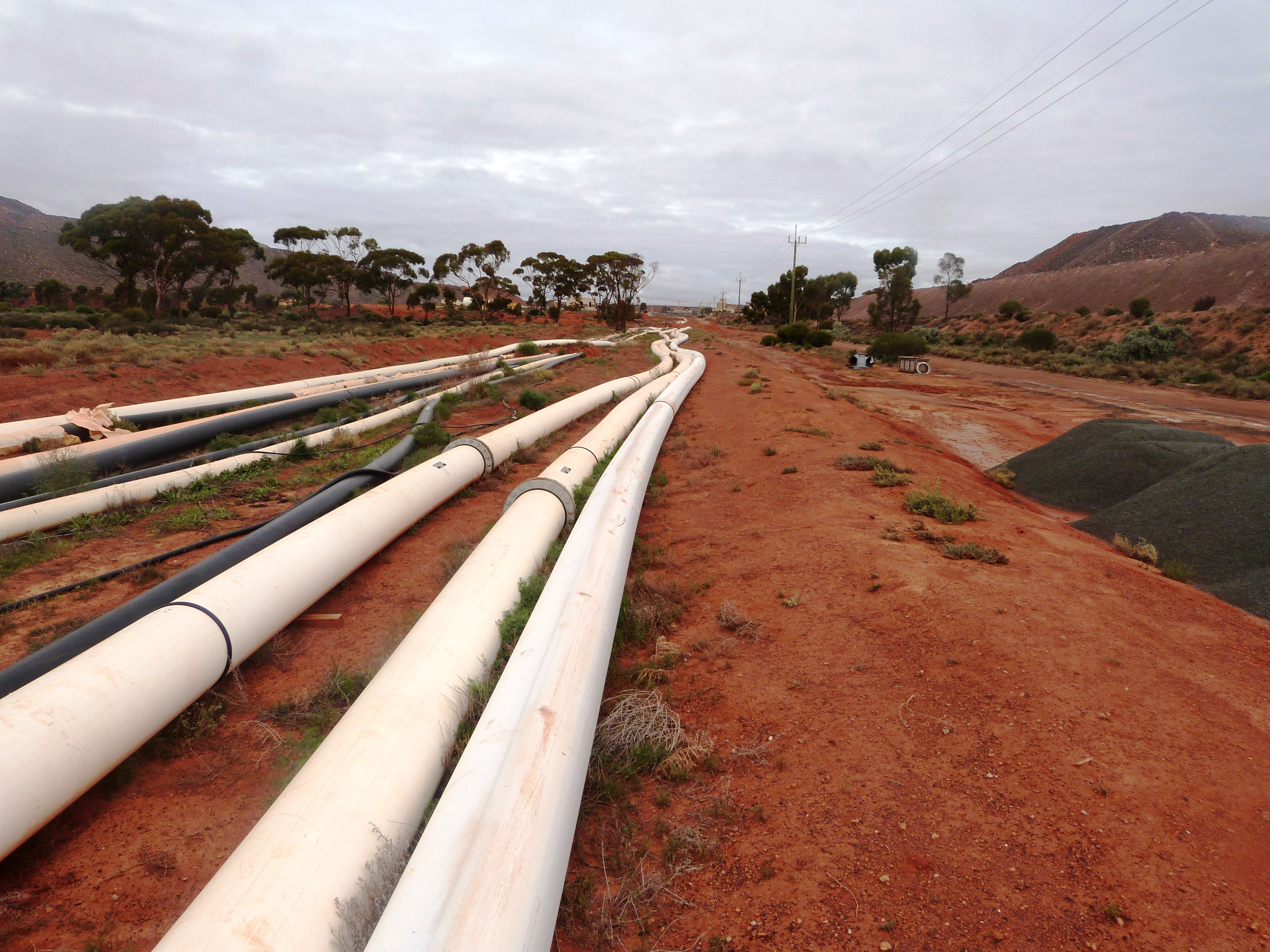
HDPE pipeline on a mine site in Australia

A pipeline is a system of pipes for long-distance transportation of a liquid or gas, typically to a market area for consumption. Industry datasets indicate the length of the global trunk/transmission pipeline network is on the order of ~2.19 million km by 2025, with North America accounting for ~44%. The United States had 65%, Russia had 8%, and Canada had 3%, thus 76% of all pipeline were in these three countries. The main attribute to pollution from pipelines is caused by corrosion and leakage.

Pipeline and Gas Journal's worldwide survey figures indicate that 118,623 miles (190,905 km) of pipelines are planned and under construction. Of these, 88,976 miles (143,193 km) represent projects in the planning and design phase; 29,647 miles (47,712 km) reflect pipelines in various stages of construction. Liquids and gases are transported in pipelines, and any chemically stable substance can be sent through a pipeline.

Pipelines exist for the transport of crude and refined petroleum, fuels—such as oil, natural gas and biofuels—and other fluids including sewage, slurry, water, beer, hot water or steam for shorter distances and even pneumatic systems which allow for the generation of suction pressure for useful work and in transporting solid objects. Pipelines are useful for transporting water for drinking or irrigation over long distances when it needs to move over hills, or where canals or channels are poor choices due to considerations of evaporation, pollution, or environmental impact.

Oil pipelines are made from steel or plastic tubes which are usually buried. The oil is moved through the pipelines by pump stations along the pipeline. Natural gas (and similar gaseous fuels) are pressurized into liquids known as natural gas liquids (NGLs). Natural gas pipelines are constructed of carbon steel. Hydrogen pipeline transport is the transportation of hydrogen through a pipe. Pipelines are one of the safest ways of transporting materials as compared to road or rail. Hence in war, pipelines are often the target of military attacks.

== Oil and natural gas ==
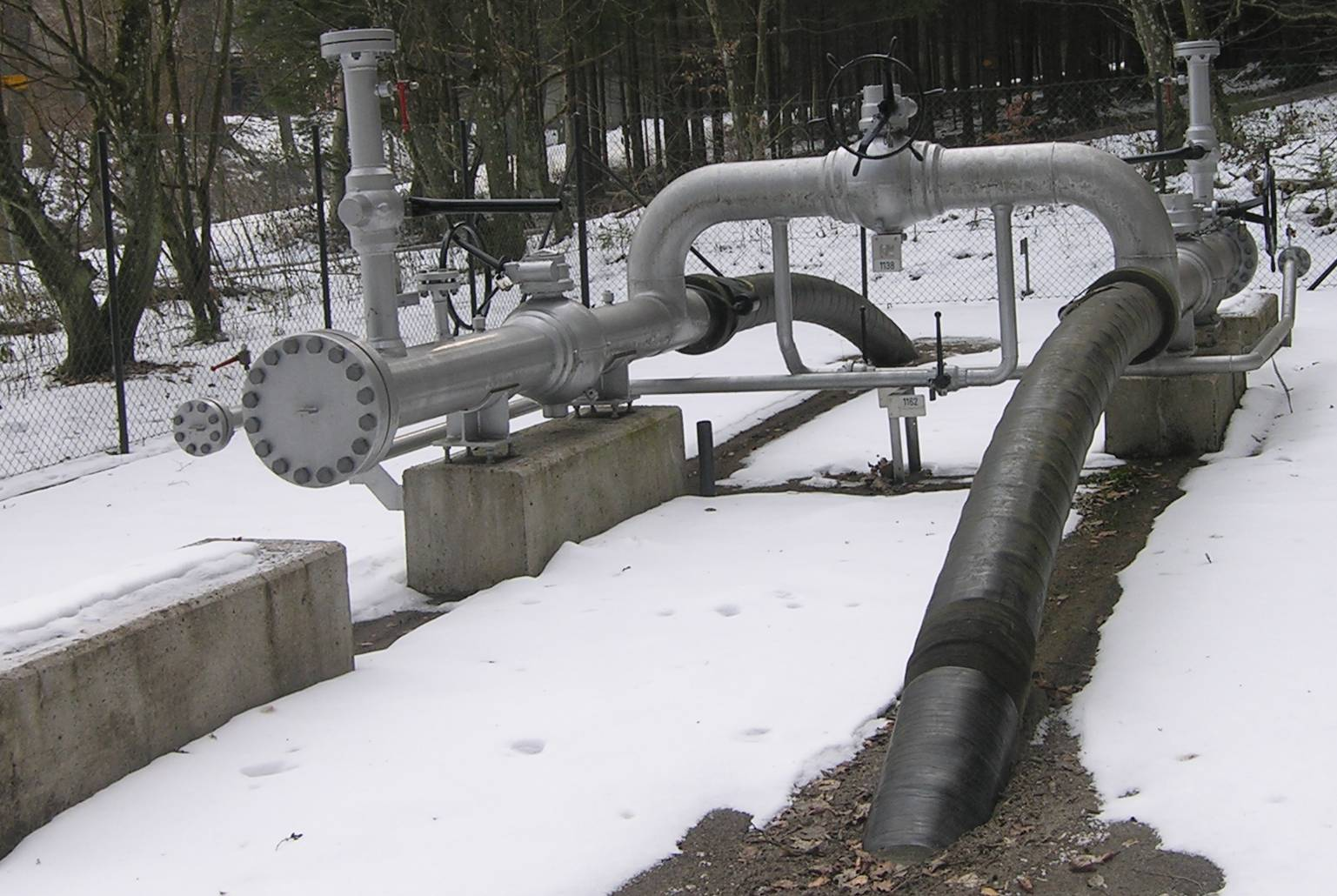
A "pig" launcher/receiver, on a natural gas pipeline in Switzerland

The first crude oil pipeline was built by the Oil Transport Association, which constructed a 2-inch (51 mm) wrought iron pipeline over a 6-mile (9.7 km) track from an oil field in Pennsylvania to a railroad station in Oil Creek, in the 1860s. Some of the first major submarine pipelines were constructed across the English Channel in 1944 during Operation Pluto. These provided an estimated 8 per cent of all petroleum products used by the Allies on the Western Front between the Normandy landings and the end of Second World War.

Pipelines are generally the most economical way to transport large quantities of oil, refined oil products or natural gas over land. For example, in 2014, pipeline transport of crude oil cost about $5 per barrel, while rail transport cost about $10 to $15 per barrel. Trucking has even higher costs due to the additional labor required; employment on completed pipelines represents only "1% of that of the trucking industry.".

In the United States, 70% of crude oil and petroleum products are shipped by pipeline. (23% are by ship, 4% by truck, and 3% by rail) In Canada for natural gas and petroleum products, 97% are shipped by pipeline.

Natural gas (and similar gaseous fuels) are lightly pressurized into liquids known as Natural Gas Liquids (NGLs). Small NGL processing facilities can be located in oil fields so the butane and propane liquid under light pressure of 125 pounds per square inch (860 kilopascals), can be shipped by rail, truck or pipeline. Propane can be used as a fuel in oil fields to heat various facilities used by the oil drillers or equipment and trucks used in the oil patch. EG: Propane will convert from a gas to a liquid under light pressure, 100 psi, give or take depending on temperature, and is pumped into cars and trucks at less than 125 psi (860 kPa) at retail stations. Pipelines and rail cars use about double that pressure to pump at 250 psi (1,700 kPa).

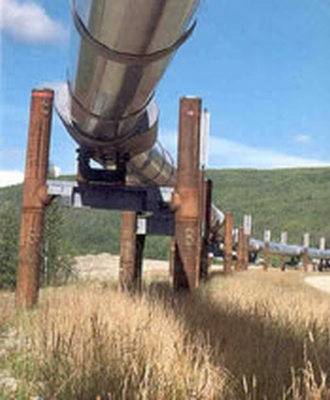
An elevated section of the Trans-Alaska Pipeline System

The distance to ship propane to markets is much shorter, as thousands of natural-gas processing plants are located in or near oil fields. Many Bakken Basin oil companies in North Dakota, Montana, Manitoba and Saskatchewan gas fields separate the NGLs in the field, allowing the drillers to sell propane directly to small wholesalers, eliminating the large refinery control of product and prices for propane or butane.

The most recent major pipeline to start operating in North America is a TransCanada natural gas line going north across the Niagara region bridges. This gas line carries Marcellus shale gas from Pennsylvania and other tied in methane or natural gas sources into the Canadian province of Ontario. It began operations in the fall of 2012, supplying 16 percent of all the natural gas used in Ontario.

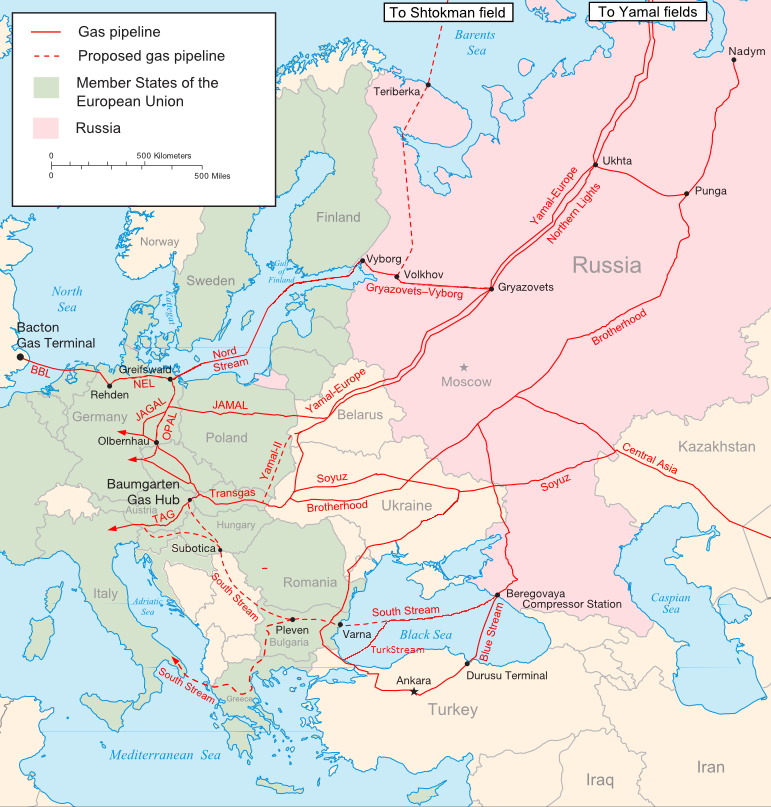
Major Russian gas pipelines to Europe in 2009. Deliveries on some pipelines were disrupted by or became controversial after the 2022 Russian invasion of Ukraine, including the 2022 Russia–European Union gas dispute.

This new US-supplied natural gas displaces the natural gas formerly shipped to Ontario from western Canada in Alberta and Manitoba, thus dropping the government regulated pipeline shipping charges because of the significantly shorter distance from gas source to consumer. To avoid delays and US government regulation, many small, medium and large oil producers in North Dakota have decided to run an oil pipeline north to Canada to meet up with a Canadian oil pipeline shipping oil from west to east. This allows the Bakken Basin and Three Forks oil producers to get higher negotiated prices for their oil because they will not be restricted to just one wholesale market in the US. The distance from the biggest oil patch in North Dakota, in Williston, North Dakota, is only about 85 miles or 137 kilometres to the Canada–US border and Manitoba. Mutual funds and joint ventures are the largest investors in new oil and gas pipelines. In the fall of 2012, the US began exporting propane to Europe, known as LPG, as wholesale prices there are much higher than in North America. Additionally, a pipeline has been constructed from North Dakota to Illinois, commonly known as the Dakota Access Pipeline.

As more North American pipelines are built, even more exports of LNG, propane, butane, and other natural gas products occur on all three US coasts. To give insight, North Dakota Bakken region's oil production has grown by 600% from 2007 to 2015. North Dakota oil companies are shipping huge amounts of oil by tanker rail car as they can direct the oil to the market that gives the best price, and rail cars can be used to avoid a congested oil pipeline to get the oil to a different pipeline in order to get the oil to market faster or to a different less busy oil refinery. However, pipelines provide a cheaper means to transport by volume.

Enbridge in Canada is applying to reverse an oil pipeline going from east to west (Line 9) and expanding it and using it to ship western Canadian bitumen oil eastward. From a presently rated 250,000 barrels equivalent per day pipeline, it will be expanded to between 1.0 and 1.3 million barrels per day. It will bring western oil to refineries in Ontario, Michigan, Ohio, Pennsylvania, Quebec and New York by early 2014. New Brunswick will also refine some of this western Canadian crude and export some crude and refined oil to Europe from its deep water oil ULCC loading port.

Although pipelines can be built under the sea, that process is economically and technically demanding, so the majority of oil at sea is transported by tanker ships. Similarly, it is often more economically feasible to transport natural gas in the form of LNG; however, the break-even point between LNG and pipelines would depend on the volume of natural gas and the distance it travels.

=== Growth of market ===
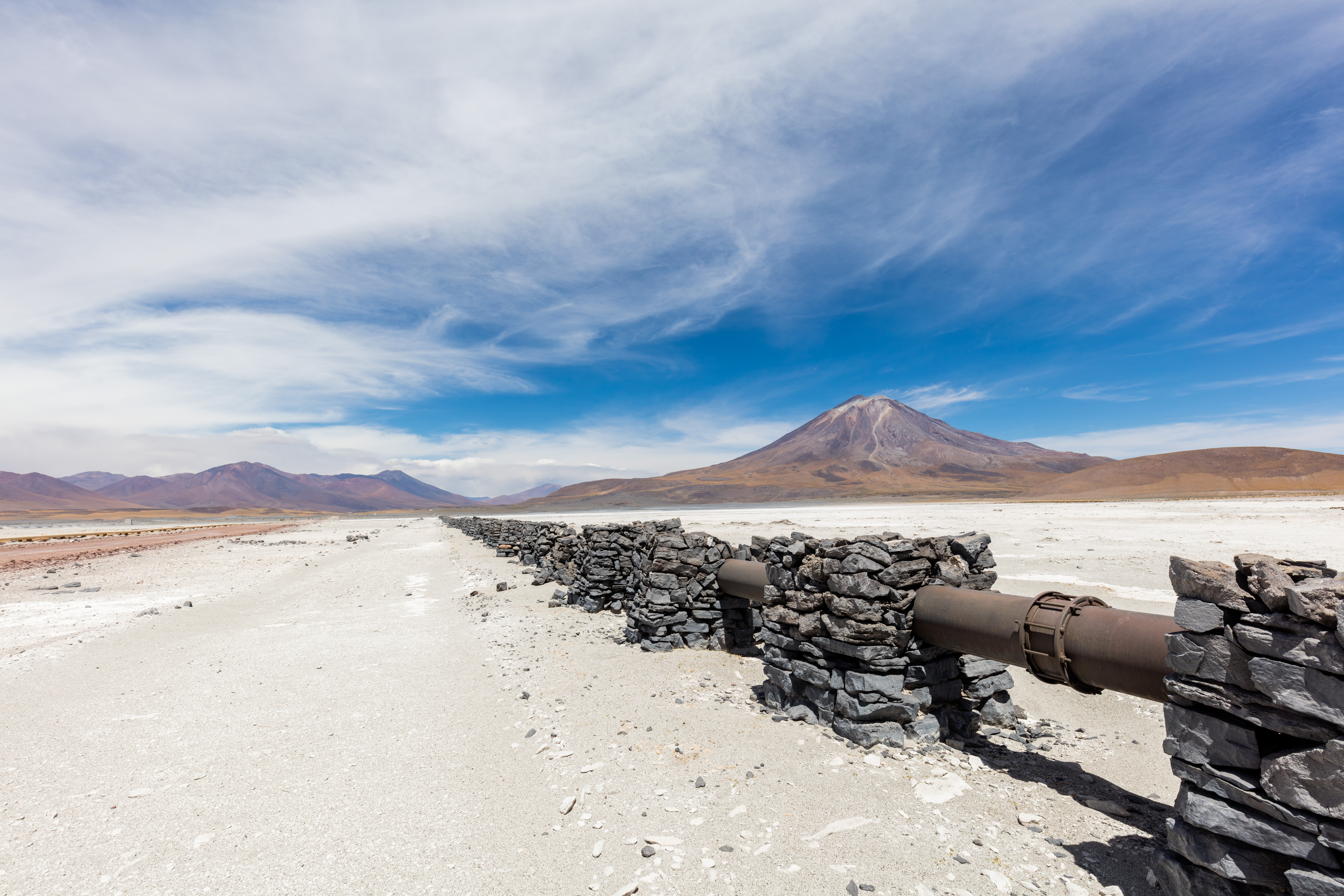
Gas pipe in the dry region of Antofagasta, Chile

The market size for oil and gas pipeline construction experienced tremendous growth prior to the economic downturn in 2008. After faltering in 2009, demand for pipeline expansion and updating increased the following year as energy production grew. By 2012, almost 32,000 miles (51,000 km) of North American pipeline were being planned or under construction. When pipelines are constrained, additional pipeline product transportation options may include the use of drag reducing agents, or by transporting product via truck or rail.

=== Construction and operation ===
Oil pipelines are made from steel or plastic tubes with inner diameter typically from 4 to 48 inches (100 to 1,220 mm). Most pipelines are typically buried at a depth of about 3 to 6 feet (0.91 to 1.83 m). To protect pipes from impact, abrasion, and corrosion, a variety of methods are used. These can include wood lagging (wood slats), concrete coating, rockshield, high-density polyethylene, imported sand padding, sacrificial cathodes and padding machines.

Crude oil contains varying amounts of paraffin wax and in colder climates wax buildup may occur within a pipeline. Often these pipelines are inspected and cleaned using pigging, the practice of using devices known as "pigs" to perform various maintenance operations on a pipeline. The devices are also known as "scrapers" or "Go-devils". "Smart pigs" (also known as "intelligent" or "intelligence" pigs) are used to detect anomalies in the pipe such as dents, metal loss caused by corrosion, cracking or other mechanical damage. These devices are launched from pig-launcher stations and travel through the pipeline to be received at any other station down-stream, either cleaning wax deposits and material that may have accumulated inside the line or inspecting and recording the condition of the line.

For natural gas, pipelines are constructed of carbon steel and vary in size from 2 to 60 inches (51 to 1,524 mm) in diameter, depending on the type of pipeline. The gas is pressurized by compressor stations and is odorless unless mixed with a mercaptan odorant where required by a regulating authority.

== Ammonia ==
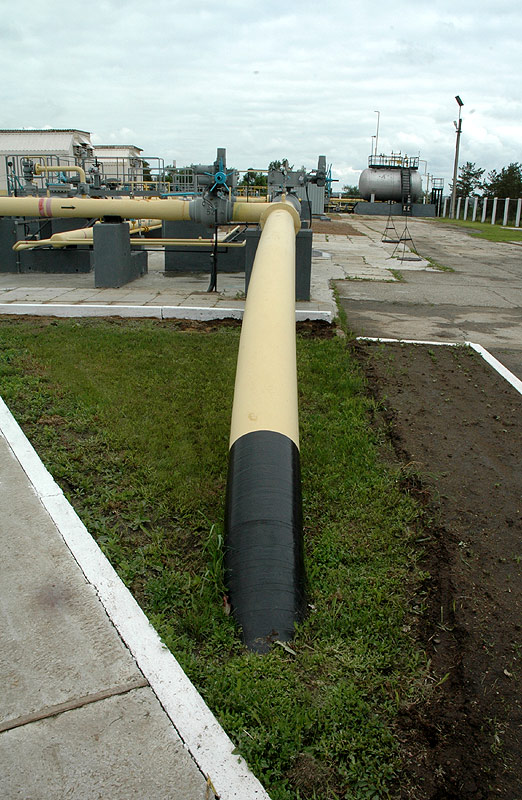
The world's longest ammonia pipeline, from Russia to Ukraine

Until damaged during the Russian invasion of Ukraine, the Russian–Ukrainian Transammiak line was the longest ammonia pipeline in the world, at 2,500 km. It connected the TogliattiAzot facility in Russia to the exporting Black Sea-port of Odesa in Ukraine.

== Alcohol fuels ==
Pipelines have been used for transportation of ethanol in Brazil, and there are several ethanol pipeline projects in Brazil and the United States. The main problems related to the transport of ethanol by pipeline are its corrosive nature and tendency to absorb water and impurities in pipelines, which are not problems with oil and natural gas. Insufficient volumes and cost-effectiveness are other considerations limiting construction of ethanol pipelines.

In the US minimal amounts of ethanol are transported by pipeline. Most ethanol is shipped by rail, the main alternatives being truck and barge. Delivering ethanol by pipeline is the most desirable option, but ethanol's affinity for water and solvent properties require the use of a dedicated pipeline, or significant cleanup of existing pipelines.

== Coal and ore ==
Slurry pipelines are sometimes used to transport coal or ore from mines. The material to be transported is closely mixed with water before being introduced to the pipeline; at the far end, the material must be dried. One example is a 525-kilometre (326 mi) slurry pipeline which is planned to transport iron ore from the Minas-Rio mine (producing 26.5 million tonnes per year) to the Port of Açu in Brazil. An existing example is the 85-kilometre (53 mi) Savage River Slurry pipeline in Tasmania, Australia, possibly the world's first when it was built in 1967. It includes a 366-metre (1,201 ft) bridge span at 167 metres (548 ft) above the Savage River.

== Hydrogen ==
Hydrogen pipeline transport is a transportation of hydrogen through a pipe as part of the hydrogen infrastructure. Hydrogen pipeline transport is used to connect the point of hydrogen production or delivery of hydrogen with the point of demand. Most hydrogen is produced at the place of demand with every 50 to 100 miles (80 to 161 km) an industrial production facility. The 1938 Rhine-Ruhr 240-kilometre (150 mi) hydrogen pipeline is still in operation. As of 2004, there are 900 miles (1,400 km) of low-pressure hydrogen pipelines in the US and 930 miles (1,500 km) in Europe.

In steel pipelines, gaseous hydrogen can accelerate fatigue-crack growth and reduce the apparent fracture toughness of line-pipe and welds, so materials must be qualified for hydrogen service using fracture-mechanics criteria. ASME B31.12 for hydrogen piping and pipelines provides such a qualification route (e.g., threshold stress-intensity in hydrogen and optional fatigue-crack-growth data). Recent evaluations on API 5L X70 line-pipe show measurable toughness reductions and faster crack growth under blended-hydrogen conditions, while recent reviews summarize hydrogen uptake, trapping and mitigation specific to pipeline steels.

== Water ==
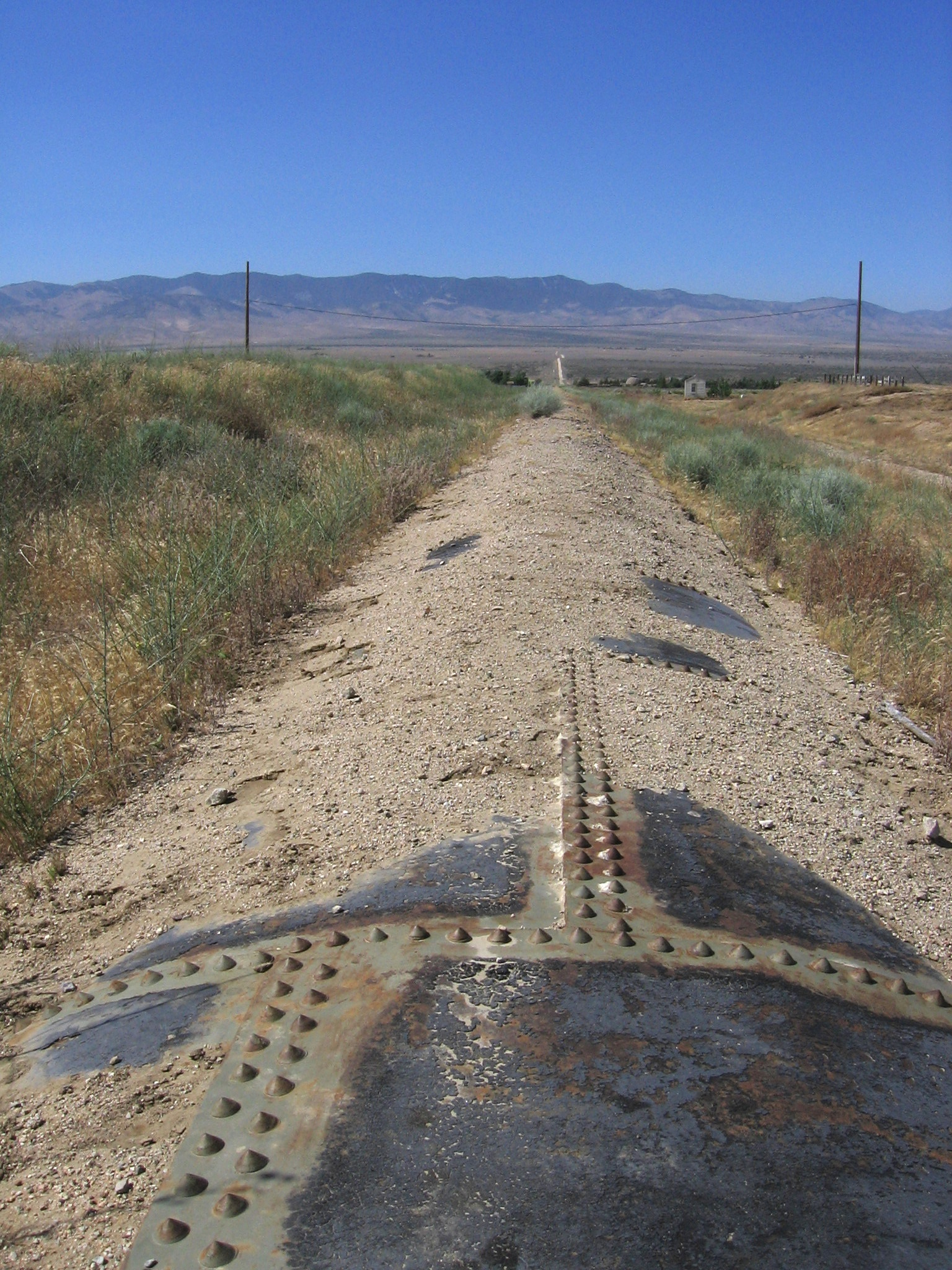
The Los Angeles Aqueduct in Antelope Valley

Two millennia ago, the ancient Romans made use of large aqueducts to transport water from higher elevations by building the aqueducts in graduated segments that allowed gravity to push the water along until it reached its destination. Hundreds of these were built throughout Europe and elsewhere, and along with flour mills were considered the lifeline of the Roman Empire. The ancient Chinese also made use of channels and pipe systems for public works. The famous Han dynasty court eunuch Zhang Rang (d. 189 AD) once ordered the engineer Bi Lan to construct a series of square-pallet chain pumps outside the capital city of Luoyang. These chain pumps serviced the imperial palaces and living quarters of the capital city as the water lifted by the chain pumps was brought in by a stoneware pipe system.

Pipelines are useful for transporting water for drinking or irrigation over long distances when it needs to move over hills, or where canals or channels are poor choices due to considerations of evaporation, pollution, or environmental impact.

The 530 km (330 mi) Goldfields Water Supply Scheme in Western Australia using 750 mm (30 in) pipe and completed in 1903 was the largest water supply scheme of its time.

Examples of significant water pipelines in South Australia are the Morgan-Whyalla pipeline (completed 1944) and Mannum-Adelaide pipeline (completed 1955) pipelines, both part of the larger Snowy Mountains scheme.

Two Los Angeles, California aqueducts, the Owens Valley aqueduct (completed 1913) and the Second Los Angeles Aqueduct (completed 1970), include extensive use of pipelines.

The Great Manmade River of Libya supplies 3.68 million m^{3} (4.81 million yd^{3}) of water each day to Tripoli, Benghazi, Sirte, and several other cities in Libya. The pipeline is over 2,800 kilometres (1,700 mi) long, and is connected to wells tapping an aquifer over 500 metres (1,600 ft) underground.

== Other systems ==
=== District heating ===
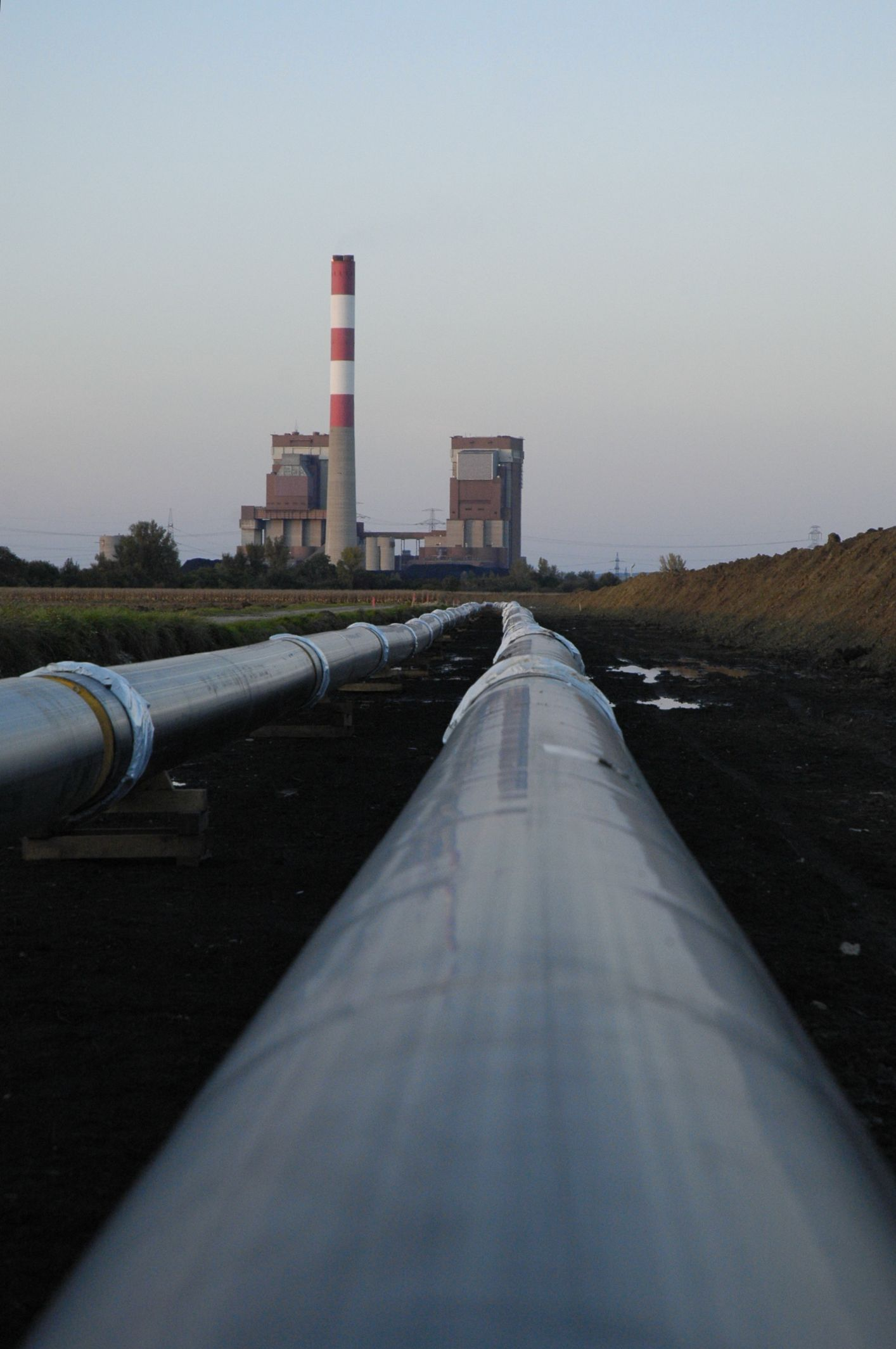
District heating pipeline in Austria with a length of 31 km

District heating or teleheating systems consist of a network of insulated feed and return pipes which transport heated water, pressurized hot water, or sometimes steam to the customer. While steam is hottest and may be used in industrial processes due to its higher temperature, it is less efficient to produce and transport due to greater heat losses. Heat transfer oils are generally not used for economic and ecological reasons. The typical annual loss of thermal energy through distribution is around 10%, as seen in Norway's district heating network.

District heating pipelines are normally installed underground, with some exceptions. Within the system, heat storage may be installed to even out peak load demands. Heat is transferred into the central heating of the dwellings through heat exchangers at heat substations, without mixing of the fluids in either system.

=== Beer ===
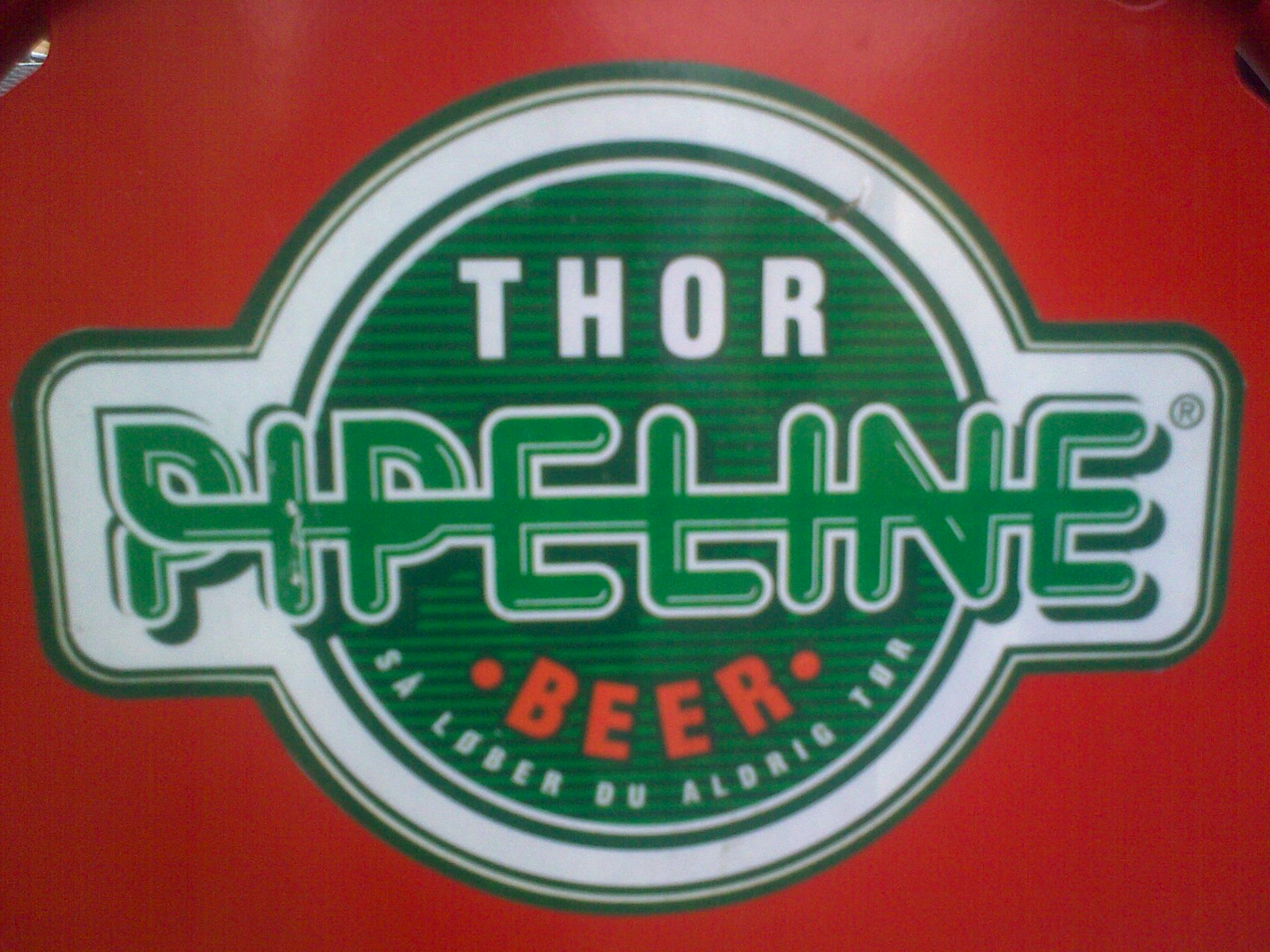
Thor Pipeline in Randers, Denmark

Bars in the Veltins-Arena, a major football ground in Gelsenkirchen, Germany, are interconnected by a 5-kilometre-long (3.1 mi) beer pipeline. In Randers city in Denmark, the so-called Thor Beer pipeline was operated. Originally, copper pipes ran directly from the brewery, but when the brewery moved out of the city in the 1990s, Thor Beer replaced it with a giant tank.

A three-kilometre beer pipeline was completed in Bruges, Belgium in September 2016 to reduce truck traffic on the city streets.

=== Brine ===
The village of Hallstatt in Austria, which is known for its long history of salt mining, claims to contain "the oldest industrial pipeline in the world", dating back to 1595. It was constructed from 13,000 hollowed-out tree trunks to transport brine 40 kilometres (25 mi) from Hallstatt to Ebensee.

=== Milk ===
Between 1978 and 1994, a 15 km milk pipeline ran between the Dutch island of Ameland and Holwerd on the mainland, of which 8 km was beneath the Wadden Sea. Every day, 30,000 litres of milk produced on the island were transported to be processed on the mainland. In 1994, the pipeline was abandoned due to high cleaning costs and the cheaper new ferry (which could carry milk trucks).

=== Pneumatic transport ===
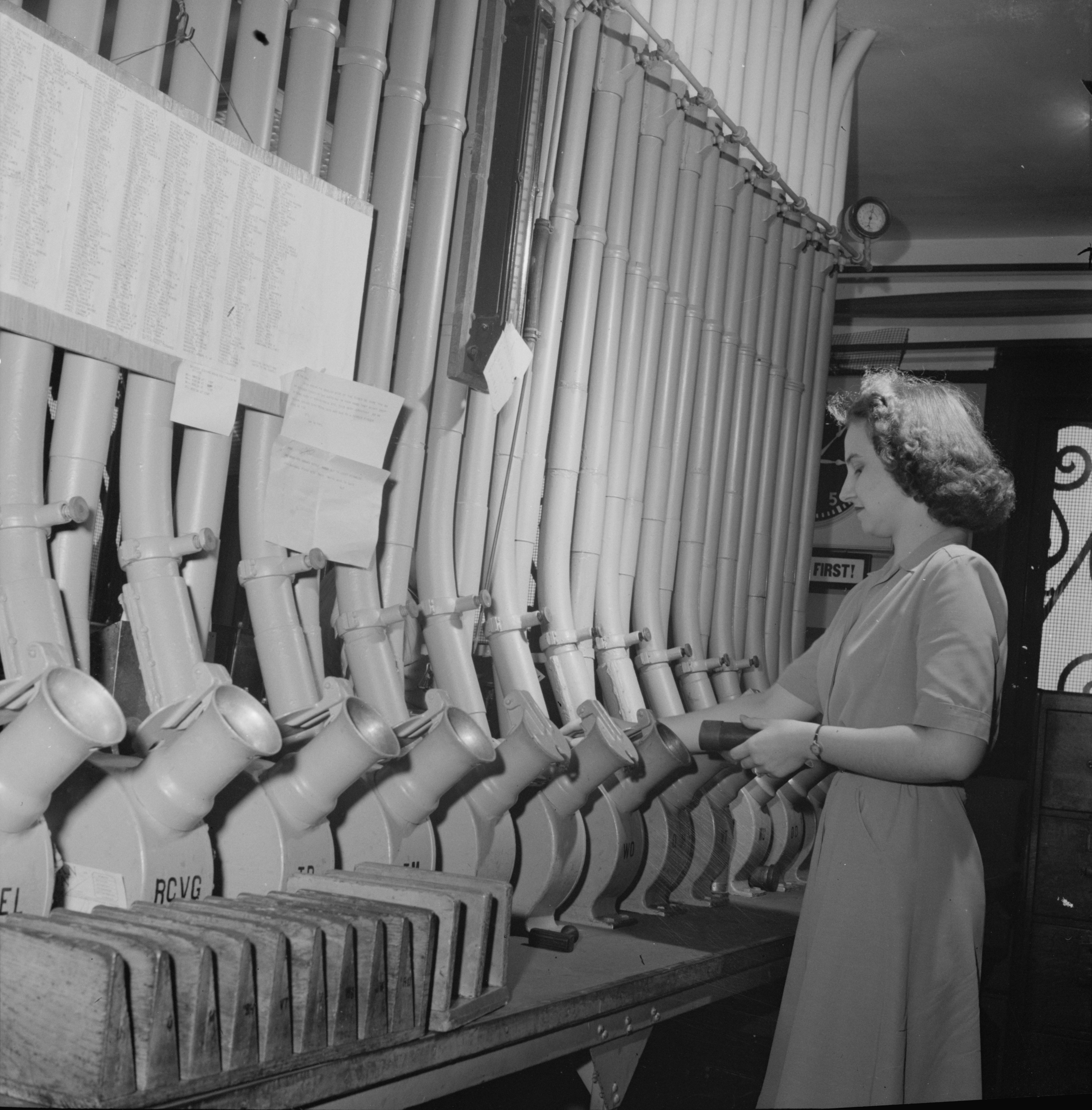
A pneumatic tube system in Washington, D.C., in 1943

Rather than transporting fluids, pneumatic tubes are usually used to transport solids in a cylindrical container by compressed air or by partial vacuum. They were most popular in the late 19th and early 20th centuries, and were used to transport small solid objects within a building, e.g. documents in an office or money in a bank. By the 21st century, pneumatic tube transport had been mostly superseded by digital solutions for transporting information, but is still used in cases where convenience and speed in a local environment are important. Hospitals, for example, use them to deliver drugs and specimens.

== Marine pipelines ==
In places, a pipeline may have to cross water expanses, such as small seas, straits and rivers. In many instances, they lie entirely on the seabed. These pipelines are referred to as "marine" pipelines (also, "submarine" or "offshore" pipelines). They are used primarily to carry oil or gas, but transportation of water is also important. In offshore projects, a distinction is made between a "flowline" and a pipeline. The former is an intrafield pipeline, in the sense that it is used to connect subsea wellheads, manifolds and the platform within a particular development field. The latter, sometimes referred to as an "export pipeline", is used to bring the resource to shore. The construction and maintenance of marine pipelines imply logistical challenges that are different from those onland, mainly because of wave and current dynamics, along with other geohazards.

== Functions ==
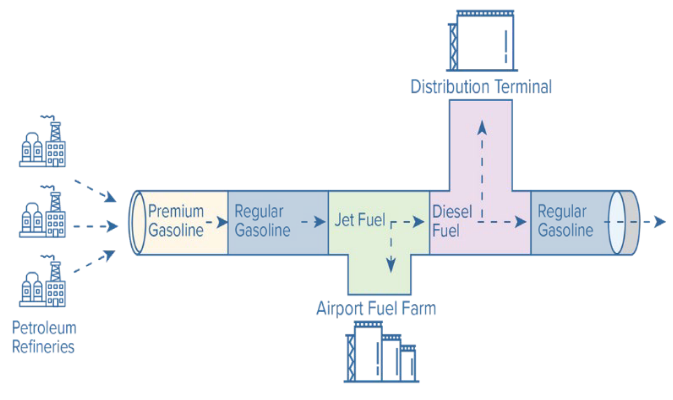
Refined petroleum product pipelines may carry multiple products at the same time, in batches that are drawn off as they reach consumers some hours or days after injection.

In general, pipelines can be classified in three categories depending on purpose:

Gathering pipelines
Group of smaller interconnected pipelines forming complex networks with the purpose of bringing crude oil or natural gas from several nearby wells to a treatment plant or processing facility. In this group, pipelines are usually short—a couple hundred metres—and with small diameters. Sub-sea pipelines for collecting product from deep water production platforms are also considered gathering systems.
Transportation pipelines
Mainly long pipes with large diameters, moving products (oil, gas, refined products) between cities, countries and even continents. These transportation networks include several compressor stations in gas lines or pump stations for crude and multi-products pipelines.
Distribution pipelines
Composed of several interconnected pipelines with small diameters, used to take the products to the final consumer. Feeder lines to distribute gas to homes and businesses downstream. Pipelines at terminals for distributing products to tanks and storage facilities are included in this groups.

== Development and planning ==
When a pipeline is built, the construction project not only covers the civil engineering work to lay the pipeline and build the pump/compressor stations, it also has to cover all the work related to the installation of the field devices that will support remote operation.

The pipeline is routed along what is known as a "right of way". Pipelines are generally developed and built using the following stages:

1. Open season to determine market interest: Potential customers are given the chance to sign up for part of the new pipeline's capacity rights.
2. Route (right of way) selection including land acquisition (eminent domain). For example in Canada, generally there are 60 m wide oil and gas pipeline buffer zones, which add up to substantial land area for long pipelines.
3. Pipeline design: The pipeline project may take a number of forms, including the construction of a new pipeline, conversion of existing pipeline from one fuel type to another, or improvements to facilities on a current pipeline route.
4. Obtaining approval: Once the design is finalized and the first pipeline customers have purchased their share of capacity, the project must be approved by the relevant regulatory agencies.
5. Surveying the route
6. Clearing the route
7. Trenching – Main Route and Crossings (roads, rail, other pipes, etc.)
8. Installing the pipe
9. Installing valves, intersections, etc.
10. Covering the pipe and trench
11. Testing: Once construction is completed, the new pipeline is subjected to tests to ensure its structural integrity. These may include hydrostatic testing and line packing.

Russia has "Pipeline Troops" as part of the Rear Services, who are trained to build and repair pipelines. Russia is the only country to have Pipeline Troops.

The US government, mainly through the EPA, the FERC and others, reviews proposed pipeline projects in order to comply with the Clean Water Act, the National Environmental Policy Act, other laws and, in some cases, municipal laws. The Biden administration has sought to permit the respective states and tribal groups to appraise and potentially block the proposed projects.

== Operation ==
Field devices are instrumentation, data gathering units and communication systems. The field instrumentation includes flow, pressure, and temperature gauges/transmitters, and other devices to measure the relevant data required. These instruments are installed along the pipeline on some specific locations, such as injection or delivery stations, pump stations (liquid pipelines) or compressor stations (gas pipelines), and block valve stations.

The information measured by these field instruments is then gathered in local remote terminal units (RTU) that transfer the field data to a central location in real time using communication systems, such as satellite channels, microwave links, or cellular phone connections.

Pipelines are controlled and operated remotely, from what is usually known as the "Main Control Room". In this center, all the data related to field measurement is consolidated in one central database. The data is received from multiple RTUs along the pipeline. It is common to find RTUs installed at every station along the pipeline.

The SCADA System for pipelines

The SCADA system at the Main Control Room receives all the field data and presents it to the pipeline operator through a set of screens or Human Machine Interface, showing the operational conditions of the pipeline. The operator can monitor the hydraulic conditions of the line, as well as send operational commands (open/close valves, turn on/off compressors or pumps, change setpoints, etc.) through the SCADA system to the field.

To optimize and secure the operation of these assets, some pipeline companies are using what is called "Advanced Pipeline Applications", which are software tools installed on top of the SCADA system, that provide extended functionality to perform leak detection, leak location, batch tracking (liquid lines), pig tracking, composition tracking, predictive modeling, look ahead modeling, and operator training.

== Technology ==
=== Components ===
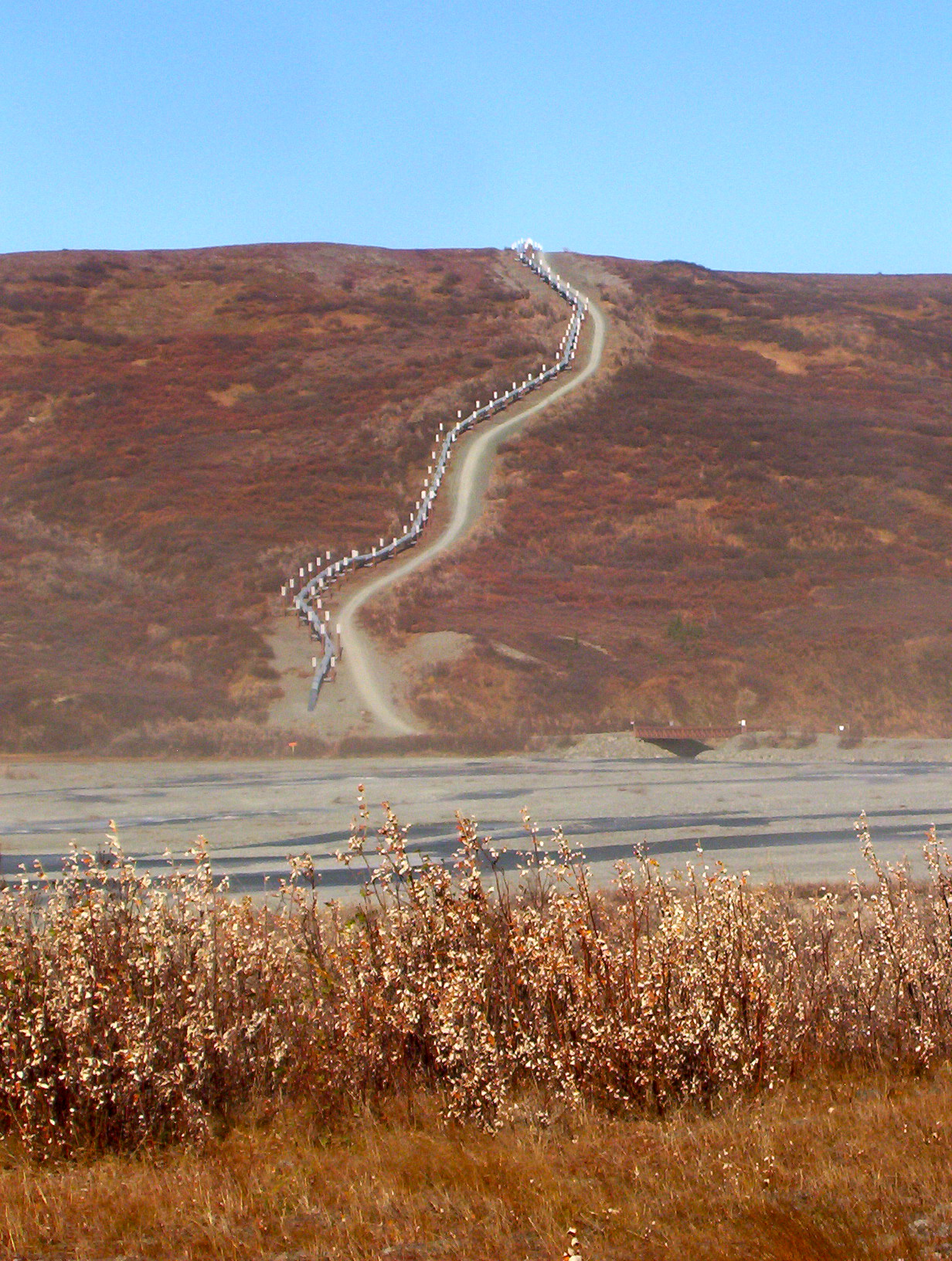
The Trans-Alaska Pipeline crossing under the Delta River and over ridge of the Alaska Range

Pipeline networks are composed of several pieces of equipment that operate together to move products from location to location. The main elements of a pipeline system are:

Initial injection station
Known also as "supply" or "inlet" station, is the beginning of the system, where the product is injected into the line. Storage facilities, pumps or compressors are usually located at these locations.

Compressor/pump stations
Pumps for liquid pipelines and compressors for gas pipelines, are located along the line to move the product through the pipeline. The location of these stations is defined by the topography of the terrain, the type of product being transported, or operational conditions of the network.

Partial delivery station
Known also as "intermediate stations", these facilities allow the pipeline operator to deliver part of the product being transported.

Block valve station
These are the first line of protection for pipelines. With these valves the operator can isolate any segment of the line for maintenance work or isolate a rupture or leak. Block valve stations are usually located every 20 to 30 miles (48 km), depending on the type of pipeline. Even though it is not a design rule, it is a very usual practice in liquid pipelines. The location of these stations depends exclusively on the nature of the product being transported, the trajectory of the pipeline and/or the operational conditions of the line.

Regulator station
This is a special type of valve station, where the operator can release some of the pressure from the line. Regulators are usually located at the downhill side of a peak.

Final delivery station
Known also as "outlet" stations or terminals, this is where the product will be distributed to the consumer. It could be a tank terminal for liquid pipelines or a connection to a distribution network for gas pipelines.

=== Leak detection systems ===
Since oil and gas pipelines are an important asset of the economic development of almost any country, it has been required either by government regulations or internal policies to ensure the safety of the assets, and the population and environment where these pipelines run.

Pipeline companies face government regulation, environmental constraints and social situations. Government regulations may define minimum staff to run the operation, operator training requirements, pipeline facilities, technology and applications required to ensure operational safety. For example, in the State of Washington it is mandatory for pipeline operators to be able to detect and locate leaks of 8 percent of maximum flow within fifteen minutes or less. Social factors also affect the operation of pipelines. Product theft is sometimes also a problem for pipeline companies. In this case, the detection levels should be under two percent of maximum flow, with a high expectation for location accuracy.

Various technologies and strategies have been implemented for monitoring pipelines, from physically walking the lines to satellite surveillance. The most common technology to protect pipelines from occasional leaks is Computational Pipeline Monitoring or CPM. CPM takes information from the field related to pressures, flows, and temperatures to estimate the hydraulic behavior of the product being transported. Once the estimation is completed, the results are compared to other field references to detect the presence of an anomaly or unexpected situation, which may be related to a leak.

The American Petroleum Institute has published several articles related to the performance of CPM in liquids pipelines. The API Publications are:

- RAM 1130 – Computational pipeline monitoring for liquids pipelines
- API 1149 – Pipeline variable uncertainties & their effects on leak detectability

Where a pipeline containing passes under a road or railway, it is usually enclosed in a protective casing. This casing is vented to the atmosphere to prevent the build-up of flammable gases or corrosive substances, and to allow the air inside the casing to be sampled to detect leaks. The casing vent, a pipe protruding from the ground, often doubles as a warning marker called a casing vent marker.

== Implementation ==
Pipelines are generally laid underground because temperature is less variable. Because pipelines are usually metal, this helps to reduce the expansion and shrinkage that can occur with weather changes. However, in some cases it is necessary to cross a valley or a river on a pipeline bridge. Pipelines for centralized heating systems are often laid on the ground or overhead. Pipelines for petroleum running through permafrost areas as Trans-Alaska Pipeline are often run overhead in order to avoid melting the frozen ground by hot petroleum which would result in sinking the pipeline in the ground.

== Maintenance ==
Maintenance of pipelines includes checking cathodic protection levels for the proper range, surveillance for construction, erosion, or leaks by foot, land vehicle, boat, or air, and running cleaning pigs when there is anything carried in the pipeline that is corrosive.

US pipeline maintenance rules are covered in Code of Federal Regulations (CFR) sections, 49 CFR 192 for natural gas pipelines, and 49 CFR 195 for petroleum liquid pipelines.

== Regulation ==
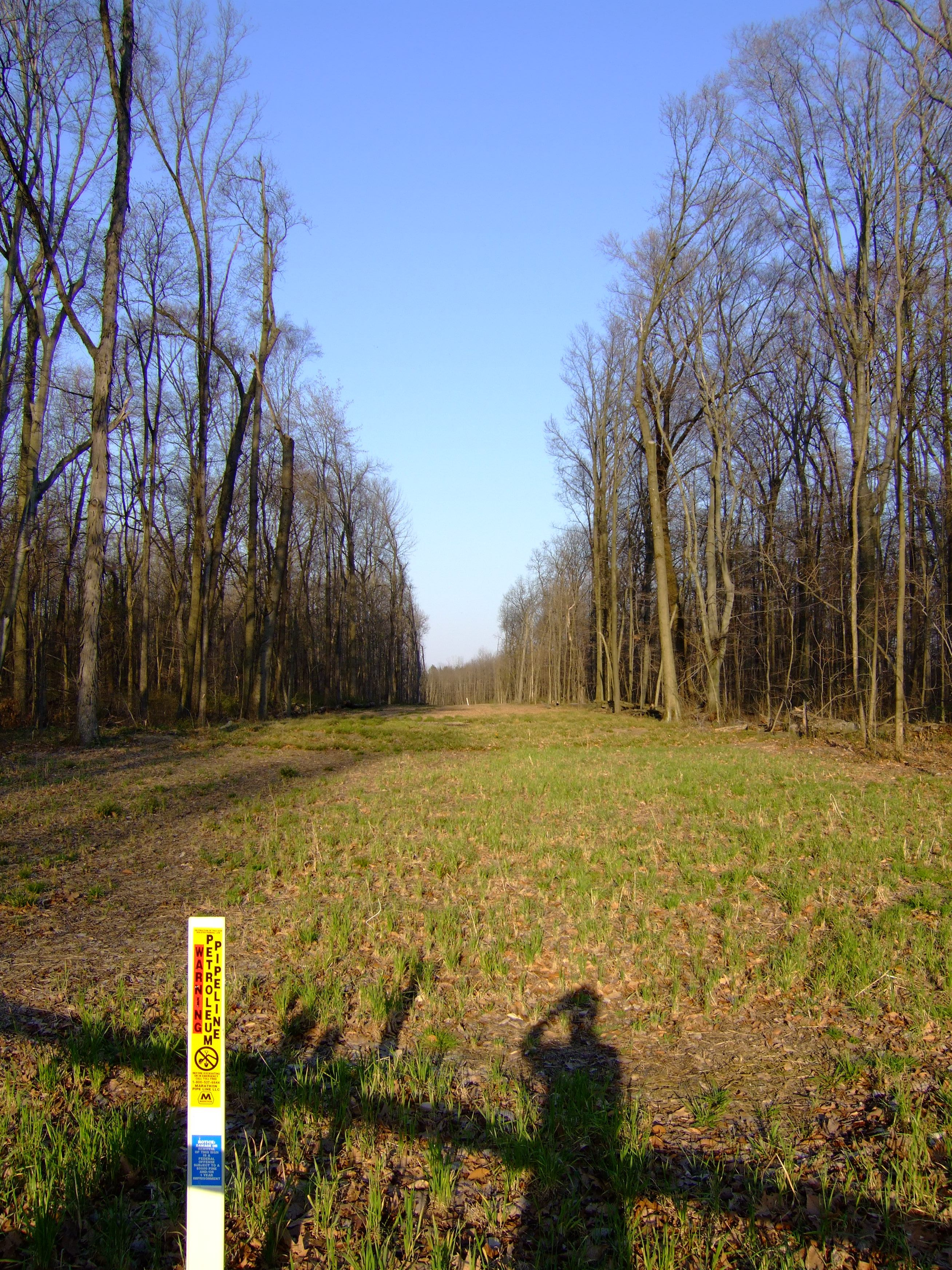
An underground petroleum pipeline running through a park

In the US, onshore and offshore pipelines used to transport oil and gas are regulated by the Pipeline and Hazardous Materials Safety Administration (PHMSA). Certain offshore pipelines used to produce oil and gas are regulated by the Minerals Management Service (MMS). In Canada, pipelines are regulated by either the provincial regulators or, if they cross provincial boundaries or the Canada–US border, by the National Energy Board (NEB). Government regulations in Canada and the United States require that buried fuel pipelines must be protected from corrosion. Often, the most economical method of corrosion control is by use of pipeline coating in conjunction with cathodic protection and technology to monitor the pipeline. Above ground, cathodic protection is not an option. The coating is the only external protection.

== Pipelines and geopolitics ==
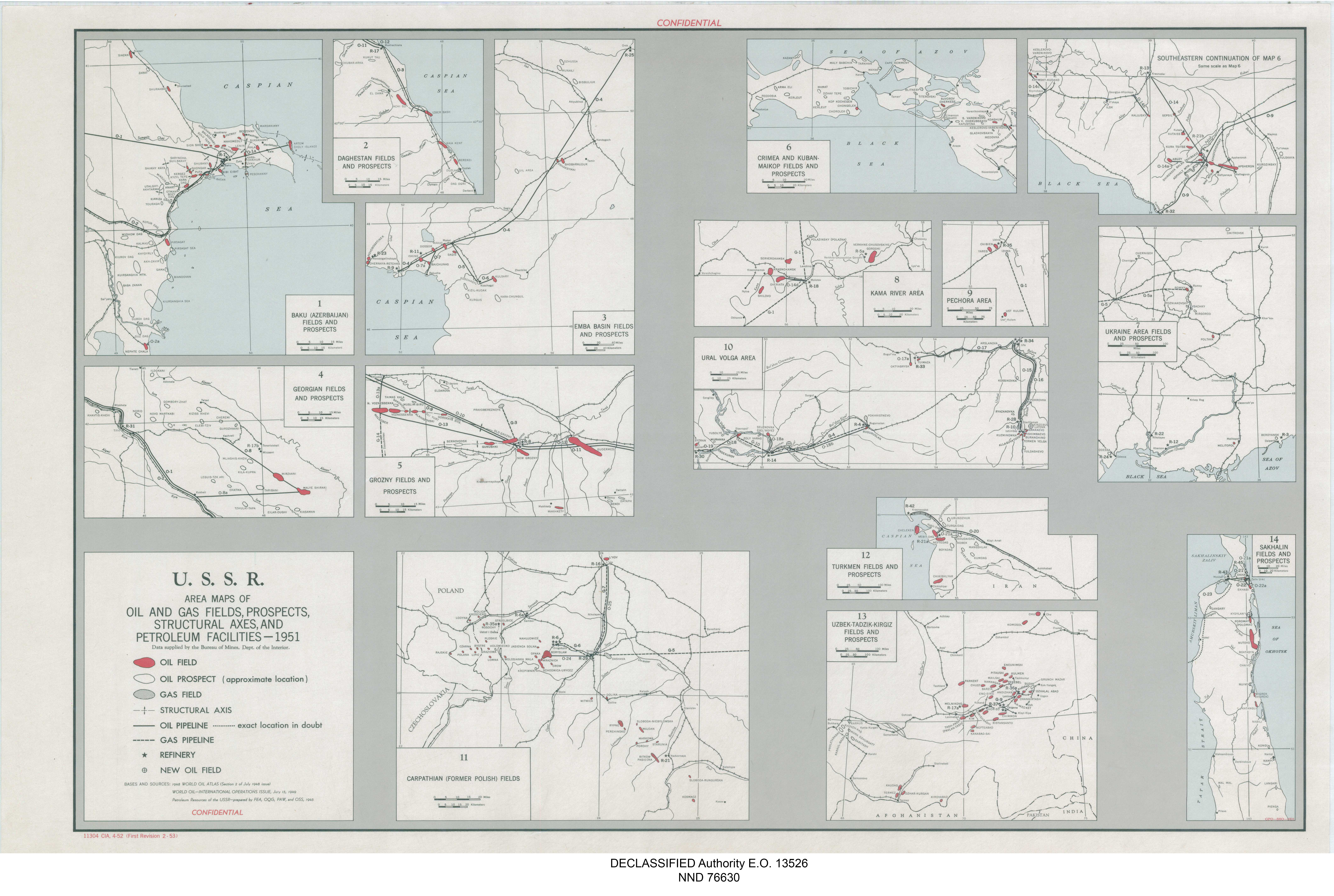
United States CIA map of pipeline infrastructure in the Soviet Union (1951)

Pipelines for major energy resources (petroleum and natural gas) are not merely an element of trade. They connect to issues of geopolitics and international security as well, and the construction, placement, and control of oil and gas pipelines often figure prominently in state interests and actions. A notable example of pipeline politics occurred at the beginning of the year 2009, wherein a dispute between Russia and Ukraine ostensibly over pricing led to a major political crisis. Russian state-owned gas company Gazprom cut off natural gas supplies to Ukraine after talks between it and the Ukrainian government fell through. In addition to cutting off supplies to Ukraine, Russian gas flowing through Ukraine—which included nearly all supplies to Southeastern Europe and some supplies to Central and Western Europe—was cut off, creating a major crisis in several countries heavily dependent on Russian gas as fuel. Russia was accused of using the dispute as leverage in its attempt to keep other powers, and particularly the European Union, from interfering in its "near abroad".

== Hazard identification ==
Because the solvent fraction of dilbit typically comprises volatile aromatics such as naptha and benzene, reasonably rapid carrier vaporization can be expected to follow an above-ground spill—ostensibly enabling timely intervention by leaving only a viscous residue that is slow to migrate. Effective protocols to minimize exposure to petrochemical vapours are well-established, and oil spilled from the pipeline would be unlikely to reach the aquifer unless incomplete remediation were followed by the introduction of another carrier (e.g. a series of torrential downpours).

The introduction of benzene and other volatile organic compounds (collectively BTEX) to the subterranean environment compounds the threat posed by a pipeline leak. Particularly if followed by rain, a pipeline breach would result in BTEX dissolution and equilibration of benzene in water, followed by percolation of the admixture into the aquifer. Benzene can cause many health problems and is carcinogenic with EPA Maximum Contaminant Level (MCL) set at 5 μg/L for potable water. Although it is not well studied, single benzene exposure events have been linked to acute carcinogenesis. Additionally, the exposure of livestock, mainly cattle, to benzene has been shown to cause many health issues, such as neurotoxicity, fetal damage and fatal poisoning.

The entire surface of an above-ground pipeline can be directly examined for material breach. Pooled petroleum is unambiguous, readily spotted, and indicates the location of required repairs. Because the effectiveness of remote inspection is limited by the cost of monitoring equipment, gaps between sensors, and data that requires interpretation, small leaks in buried pipe can sometimes go undetected.

Pipeline developers do not always prioritize effective surveillance against leaks. Buried pipes draw fewer complaints. They are insulated from extremes in ambient temperature, they are shielded from ultraviolet rays, and they are less exposed to photodegradation. Buried pipes are isolated from airborne debris, electrical storms, tornadoes, hurricanes, hail, and acid rain. They are protected from nesting birds, rutting mammals, and stray buckshot. Buried pipe is less vulnerable to accident damage (e.g. automobile collisions) and less accessible to vandals, saboteurs, and terrorists.

== Exposure ==
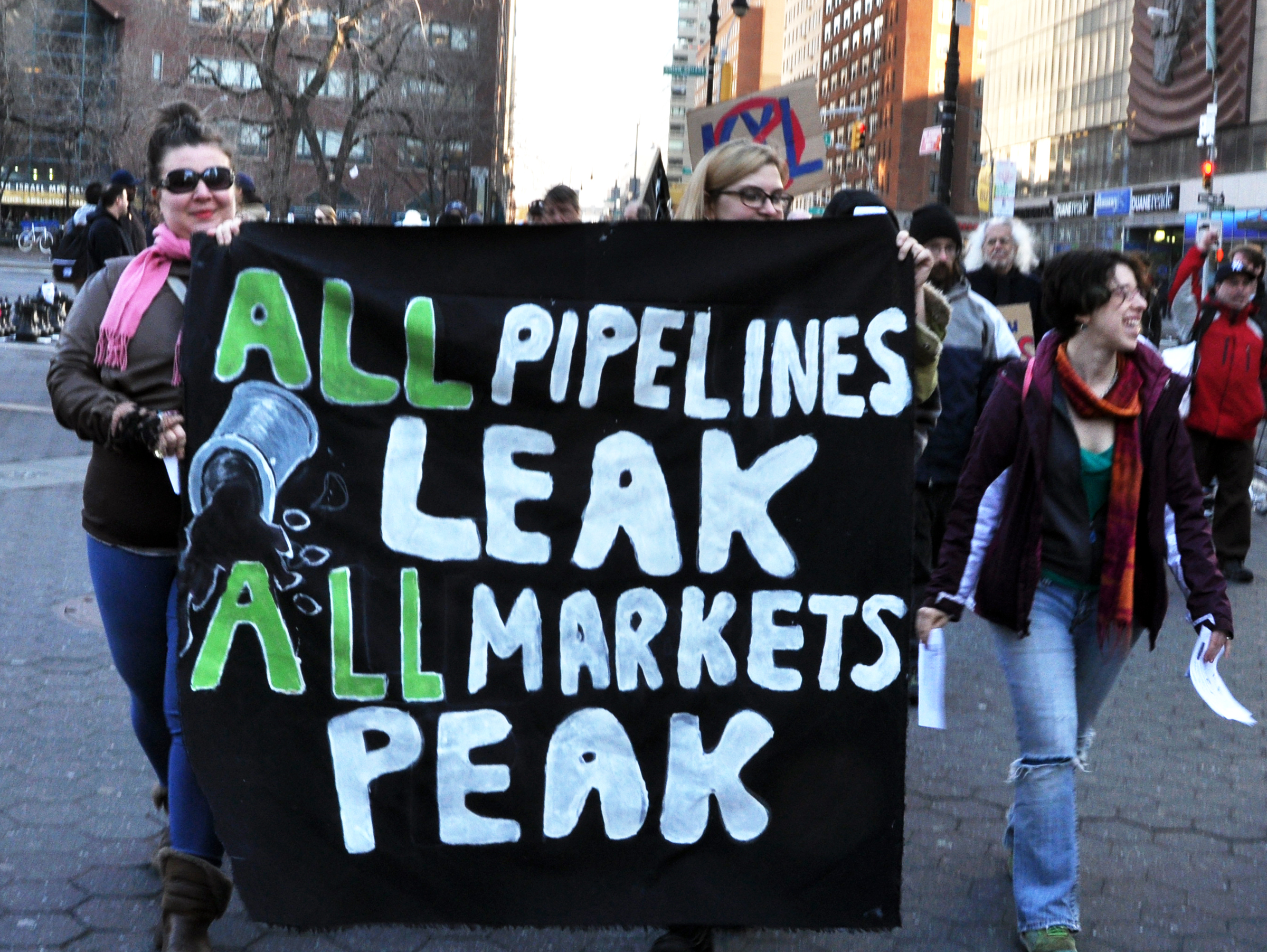
Protest against the Keystone Pipeline

Previous work has shown that a 'worst-case exposure scenario' can be limited to a specific set of conditions. Based on the advanced detection methods and pipeline shut-off SOP developed by TransCanada, the risk of a substantive or large release over a short period of time contaminating groundwater with benzene is unlikely. Detection, shutoff, and remediation procedures would limit the dissolution and transport of benzene. Therefore, the exposure of benzene would be limited to leaks that are below the limit of detection and go unnoticed for extended periods of time. Leak detection is monitored through a SCADA system that assesses pressure and volume flow every 5 seconds. A pinhole leak that releases small quantities that cannot be detected by the SCADA system (<1.5% flow) could accumulate into a substantive spill. Detection of pinhole leaks would come from a visual or olfactory inspection, aerial surveying, or mass-balance inconsistencies. It is assumed that pinhole leaks are discovered within the 14-day inspection interval; however, snow cover and location (e.g. remote, deep) could delay detection. Benzene typically makes up 0.1 to 1.0% of oil and will have varying degrees of volatility and dissolution based on environmental factors.

Even with pipeline leak volumes within SCADA detection limits, sometimes pipeline leaks are misinterpreted by pipeline operators to be pump malfunctions, or other problems. The Enbridge Line 6B crude oil pipeline failure in Marshall, Michigan, on July 25, 2010, was thought by operators in Edmonton to be from column separation of the dilbit in that pipeline. The leak in wetlands along the Kalamazoo River was only confirmed 17 hours after it happened by a local gas company employee.

=== Spill frequency-volume ===
Although the Pipeline and Hazardous Materials Safety Administration (PHMSA) has standard baseline incident frequencies to estimate the number of spills, TransCanada altered these assumptions based on improved pipeline design, operation, and safety. Whether these adjustments are justified is debatable as these assumptions resulted in a nearly ten-fold decrease in spill estimates. Given that the pipeline crosses 247 miles of the Ogallala Aquifer, or 14.5% of the entire pipeline length, and the 50-year life of the entire pipeline is expected to have between 11 and 91 spills, approximately 1.6 to 13.2 spills can be expected to occur over the aquifer. An estimate of 13.2 spills over the aquifer, each lasting 14 days, results in 184 days of potential exposure over the 50-year lifetime of the pipeline. In the reduced-scope worst-case exposure scenario, the volume of a pinhole leak at 1.5% of max flow-rate for 14 days has been estimated at 189,000 barrels or 7.9 million gallons of oil. According to PHMSA's incident database, only 0.5% of all spills in the last ten years were more than 10,000 barrels.

=== Benzene fate and transport ===
Scenario for benzene leaching to groundwater

Benzene is considered a light aromatic hydrocarbon with high solubility and high volatility. It is unclear how temperature and depth would impact the volatility of benzene, so assumptions have been made that benzene in oil (1% weight by volume) would not volatilize before equilibrating with water.

Using the octanol-water partition coefficient and a 100-year precipitation event for the area, a worst-case estimate of 75 mg/L of benzene is anticipated to flow toward the aquifer. The actual movement of the plume through groundwater systems is not well described, although one estimate is that up to 4.9 billion gallons of water in the Ogallala Aquifer could become contaminated with benzene at concentrations above the MCL. The Final Environmental Impact Statement from the State Department does not include a quantitative analysis because it assumed that most benzene will volatilize.

=== Previous dilbit spill remediation difficulties ===
One of the major concerns over dilbit is the difficulty in cleaning it up. When the aforementioned Enbridge Line 6B crude oil pipeline ruptured in Marshall, Michigan in 2010, at least 843,000 gallons of dilbit were spilled. After detection of the leak, booms and vacuum trucks were deployed. Heavy rains caused the river to overtop existing dams, and carried dilbit 30 miles downstream before the spill was contained. Remediation work collected over 1.1 million gallons of oil and almost 200,000 cubic yards of oil-contaminated sediment and debris from the Kalamazoo River system. However, oil was still being found in affected waters in October 2012.

== Accidents and dangers ==
Pipelines can help ensure a country's economic well-being and as such present a likely target of terrorists or wartime adversaries. Fossil fuels can be transported by pipeline, rail, truck or ship, though natural gas requires compression or liquefaction to make vehicle transport economical. For transport of crude oil via these four modes, various reports rank pipelines as proportionately causing less human death and property damage than rail and truck and spilling less oil than truck.

=== Accidents ===
Pipelines conveying flammable or explosive material, such as natural gas or oil, pose special safety concerns. While corrosion, pressure, and equipment failure are common causes, excavation damage is also a leading accident type that can be avoided by calling 811 before digging near pipelines.

- 1965 – A 32-inch gas transmission pipeline, north of Natchitoches, Louisiana, belonging to the Tennessee Gas Pipeline exploded and burned from stress corrosion cracking failure on March 4, killing 17 people. At least 9 others were injured, and 7 homes 450 feet from the rupture were destroyed. This accident, and others of the era, led then-President Lyndon B. Johnson to call for the formation of a national pipeline safety agency in 1967. The same pipeline had also had an explosion on May 9, 1955, just 930 feet (280 m) from the 1965 failure.
- June 16, 1976 – A gasoline pipeline was ruptured by a road construction crew in Los Angeles, California. Gasoline sprayed across the area, and soon ignited, killing 9, and injuring at least 14 others. Confusion over the depth of the pipeline in the construction area seemed to be a factor in the accident.
- June 4, 1989 – The Ufa train disaster: Sparks from two passing trains detonated gas leaking from a LPG pipeline near Ufa, Russia. At least 575 people were reported killed.
- October 17, 1998 – 1998 Jesse pipeline explosion: A petroleum pipeline exploded at Jesse on the Niger Delta in Nigeria, killing about 1,200 villagers, some of whom were scavenging gasoline.
- June 10, 1999 – A pipeline rupture in a Bellingham, Washington park led to the release of 277,200 gallons of gasoline. The gasoline was ignited, causing an explosion that killed two children and one adult. Misoperation of the pipeline and a previously damaged section of the pipe that was not detected before were identified as causing the failure.
- August 19, 2000 – A natural gas pipeline rupture and fire near Carlsbad, New Mexico; this explosion and fire killed 12 members of an extended family. The cause was due to severe internal corrosion of the pipeline.
- July 30, 2004 – A major natural gas pipeline exploded in Ghislenghien, Belgium near Ath (thirty kilometres southwest of Brussels), killing at least 24 people and leaving 132 wounded, some critically.
- May 12, 2006 – An oil pipeline ruptured outside Lagos, Nigeria. Up to 200 people may have been killed. See Nigeria oil blast.
- November 1, 2007 – A propane pipeline exploded near Carmichael, Mississippi, about 30 miles (48 km) south of Meridian, Mississippi. Two people were killed instantly and an additional four were injured. Several homes were destroyed and sixty families were displaced. The pipeline is owned by Enterprise Products Partners LP, and runs from Mont Belvieu, Texas, to Apex, North Carolina. Inability to find flaws in pre-1971 ERW seam welded pipe flaws was a contributing factor to the accident.
- September 9, 2010 – 2010 San Bruno pipeline explosion: A 30-inch-diameter high-pressure natural gas pipeline owned by the Pacific Gas and Electric Company exploded in the Crestmoor residential neighborhood 2 miles (3.2 km) west of San Francisco International Airport, killing 8, injuring 58, and destroying 38 homes. Poor quality control of the pipe used & of the construction were cited as factors in the accident.
- June 27, 2014 – An explosion occurred after a natural gas pipe line ruptured in Nagaram village, East Godavari district, Andhra Pradesh, India causing 16 deaths and destroying "scores of homes".
- July 31, 2014 – On the night of July 31, a series of explosions originating in underground gas pipelines occurred in the city of Kaohsiung, Taiwan. Leaking gas filled the sewers along several major thoroughfares and the resulting explosions turned several kilometers of road surface into deep trenches, sending vehicles and debris high into the air and igniting fires over a large area. At least 32 people were killed and 321 injured.

=== As targets ===
Pipelines can be the target of vandalism, sabotage, or even terrorist attacks. For example, between early 2011 and July 2012, a natural gas pipeline connecting Egypt to Israel and Jordan was attacked 15 times. In 2019, a fuel pipeline north of Mexico City exploded after fuel thieves tapped into the line. At least sixty-six people were reported to have been killed. In war, pipelines are often the target of military attacks, as destruction of pipelines can seriously disrupt enemy logistics. On 26 September 2022, a series of explosions and subsequent major gas leaks occurred on the Nord Stream 1 and Nord Stream 2 pipelines that run to Europe from Russia under the Baltic Sea. The leaks are believed to have been caused by an act of sabotage.

== See also ==
- Lists of pipelines
- Biogas
- Black powder in gas pipelines
- Coal pipeline
- District heating
- Geomagnetically induced current (GIC)
- HCNG dispenser
- HDPE pipe
- Hot tapping
- Hydraulically activated pipeline pigging
- Hydrogen pipeline transport
- Hydrostatic test
- Inland Petroleum Distribution System
- List of countries by total length of pipelines
- List of natural gas pipelines
- List of pipeline accidents
- Natural gas pipeline system in the United States
- Gas networks simulation
- Operation Pluto
- Petroleum transport
- Pigging
- Pipelayer
- Pipeline bridge
- Pneumatic tube, a method for sending documents and other solid materials in capsules through a tube
- Plastic pipework
- Reinforced thermoplastic pipe
- Russia–Ukraine gas disputes
- Slurry pipeline
- Sprayed in place pipe
- Trans-Alaska Pipeline Authorization Act
