= Tony Trahar =

Tony Trahar (born 1949 in Johannesburg, South Africa) is a South African businessman and former chairman of Anglo American.

Trahar was educated at St John's College and the University of the Witwatersrand, after which he qualified as a chartered accountant.

He joined Anglo American in 1974 and later was an assistant to Gavin Relly and was appointed finance director in 1982. Trahar became the managing director of Anglo American's paper company, Mondi, in 1986. He succeeded Julian Ogilvie Thompson as CEO of Anglo American in 2000.

Trahar stepped down as chairman and CEO in 2007, succeeded by Cynthia Carroll.
