= PeroCycle =

Decarbonisation technology for steelmaking

PeroCycle is a carbon recycling technology developed for reducing carbon dioxide (CO_{2}) emissions in steel production. It is designed to be integrated into blast furnace-basic oxygen furnace (BF-BOF) steelmaking, allowing existing steel plants to lower emissions while maintaining production capacity. The technology originates from research conducted at the University of Birmingham and has received support from Anglo American and Cambridge Future Tech.

== Background ==
Steel production is a significant source of global CO_{2} emissions, contributing approximately 2.8 billion tonnes annually, which accounts for around 8% of worldwide emissions. Traditional steel manufacturing relies on coal and coke as reducing agents, making decarbonisation challenging. Various approaches have been explored to lower emissions, including hydrogen-based reduction and carbon capture. PeroCycle represents an alternative by focusing on in-process carbon recycling rather than replacing existing infrastructure.

== Technology ==
PeroCycle employs a thermochemical reactor to process flue gas emissions from steelmaking. The system converts CO_{2} into carbon monoxide (CO) and oxygen, enabling the CO to be reused in the steel production process. This approach is based on double perovskite materials, which allow for CO_{2} splitting at lower temperatures compared to conventional methods. By using CO as a substitute for coal or coke, the technology aims to reduce overall emissions within the existing steelmaking framework.

== Implementation and development ==
The technology builds upon research from the Birmingham Centre for Energy Storage at the University of Birmingham. It has been developed with the intention of being retrofitted into existing steel plants, avoiding the need for entirely new facilities. This method offers a potential means of reducing emissions while maintaining the viability of current steel production processes.

PeroCycle has received industry support from Anglo American, which has expressed interest in reducing emissions in steel supply chains, and Cambridge Future Tech, which is involved in commercialising the technology. The concept has been discussed in industrial decarbonisation research, though further studies and independent evaluations would be necessary to assess its long-term effectiveness and scalability.

== Potential impact ==
If successfully deployed, PeroCycle could contribute to lowering carbon emissions in the steel sector while preserving the ability to produce a wide range of steel compositions. It represents one of several emerging approaches aimed at addressing the challenges of industrial decarbonisation.
