= Anglo American plc =

British multinational mining company

- Type: Public
- Traded as: LSE: AAL; JSE: AGL; FTSE 100 Component
- ISIN: GB00B1XZS820
- Industry: Metals and mining
- Founded: 1917 (Johannesburg) (Anglo American Corporation); 1999 (London) (Anglo American plc)
- Founder: Ernest Oppenheimer
- Headquarters: London, England, UK
- Area served: Worldwide
- Key people: Stuart Chambers (chairman of the board); Duncan Wanblad (chief executive)
- Products: Copper; diamonds; iron ore; metallurgical coal; nickel; platinum; thermal coal
- Revenue: ▲US$18.546 billion (2025)
- Operating income: ▼US$4.035 billion (2025)
- Net income: ▼US$(3.741) billion (2025)
- Number of employees: 58,000 (2025)
- Subsidiaries: De Beers; Kumba Iron Ore
- Website: angloamerican.com

Anglo American plc is a British multinational mining company with headquarters in London, England. It is the world's largest producer of platinum, representing approximately 40 percent of global output, as well as being a major producer of diamonds, copper, nickel, iron ore, polyhalite and steelmaking coal. The company has operations in Africa, Asia, Australia, Europe, North America and South America.

Anglo American has a primary listing on the London Stock Exchange and is a constituent of the FTSE 100 Index. The company has a secondary listing on the Johannesburg Stock Exchange. In the 2020 Forbes Global 2000, Anglo American was ranked as the 274th largest public company in the world.

== History ==
=== 1917–1990 ===
Ernest Oppenheimer, a Jewish German émigré, founded the Anglo American Corporation (AAC) in 1917 in Johannesburg, South Africa, with financial backing from the American bank J.P. Morgan & Co. and £1 million raised from UK and US sources to start the gold mining company; this fact is reflected in the company's name. The AAC became the majority stakeholder in the De Beers company in 1926, a company formerly controlled by Alfred Beit, also a Jewish German émigré.

In the late 1940s and 1950s, the AAC focused on the development of the Free State goldfields (seven major mines simultaneously) and the Vaal Reefs mine. During 1945, the AAC moved into the coal industry by acquiring Coal Estates. Twelve years later, Oppenheimer died in Johannesburg and was succeeded as head of the company by his son Harry, who also became chairman of De Beers.

In 1961, the AAC expanded outside of southern Africa for the first time and became a major investor in The Hudson Bay Mining and Smelting Company. In 1967, the company moved into the steel industry by acquiring Scaw Metals. From 1967 to 1975, it continued to grow and established a number of ventures, including the Mondi Group (timber, pulp and paper), Amgold (later AngloGold Ashanti) and then Amcoal (through the consolidation of several of its mining operations in South Africa; later known as Anglo Coal and in 2010 changed to Anglo Thermal). In 1982, Harry Oppenheimer retired as chairman of the AAC and was succeeded by Gavin Relly. Two years later, Oppenheimer retired from De Beers and passed the chairmanship to Julian Ogilvie Thompson, who in 1990 also became chairman and chief executive of the AAC.

=== 1990–2010 ===
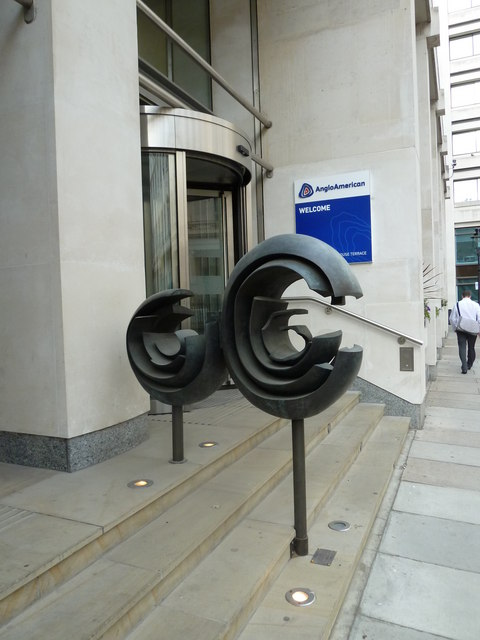
Sculptures outside Anglo American offices in London

On 24 May 1999, Anglo American Corporation merged with Minorco to form Anglo American plc, with its primary listing on the London Stock Exchange and a secondary listing on the Johannesburg Stock Exchange. Its gold mining operations were spun off into the separate AngloGold corporation, which in 2004 merged with the Ashanti Goldfields Corporation to form AngloGold Ashanti. Anglo American reduced its stake in AngloGold Ashanti to 16.6% in 2008.

In 2000, Julian Ogilvie Thompson retired as chief executive of Anglo American and was succeeded by Tony Trahar. Ogilvie Thompson also retired as chairman in 2002 and was replaced by Mark Moody-Stuart. In the same year, Anglo American acquired Tarmac, a supplier of building materials, and Shell Petroleum Company's Australian coal assets. In 2001, De Beers was privatised after being a listed company for more than 70 years.

In 2002, South Africa's Mining Charter was approved, and Anglo American and other mining companies with operations in the country were mandated to transfer a percentage of their South African production to historically disadvantaged South Africans. From 2002 to July 2008, Anglo American carried out black community economic empowerment transactions (across all businesses with operations in South Africa) totalling R26 billion. Also, in 2002, Anglo Base Metals acquired the Disputada de Las Condes copper operations in Chile from ExxonMobil and opened a representative office in Beijing, China. The Diputada de Las Condes purchase became later controversial in Chile when it was made public that Exxon Minerals had purchased the mine from Chilean state-owned ENAMI for 93 million US$ in 1977 and sold it to Anglo American for 1,300 million US$. In 2003, Anglo American acquired a majority stake in iron ore producer Kumba Resources.

In 2007, Cynthia Carroll succeeded Tony Trahar, becoming the first non-South African and first female chief executive of Anglo American. The Mondi Group, a paper and packaging business, was also spun out in 2007. During the next two years, Anglo American opened a representative office in New Delhi, India, acquired control of the Michiquillay copper project in northern Peru and the MMX Minas-Rio and Amapa iron ore projects in Brazil, and later acquired stakes in the Pebble copper project in Alaska.

In 2007, Anglo American was criticized for a project that threatened to cause environmental damage. In order to complete the Alaskan Pebble Mine in collaboration with Northern Dynasty Minerals, it considered building a massive dam at the headwaters of the world's largest sockeye salmon fishery. Opponents claimed that cyanide, heavy metals and acid mine drainage could have devastating effects on the Bristol Bay area. Opponents of Pebble Mine created Ballot Measure 4 to impose more stringent water quality standards on new mines, but in August 2007, the initiative was rejected. As of September 2008, the Pebble Limited Partnership had not yet put forward a project proposal and was working to prepare a prefeasibility study for the project in the second half of 2009. The mine proposal would still need to undergo environmental studies and the permitting process, including being subject to state and federal water protections. In December 2013, Anglo American withdrew from the Pebble Limited Partnership.

=== 2010 to 2020 ===
In early November 2011, Anglo American entered into talks with the Oppenheimer family to divest the latter's remaining shares of De Beers, whereby Anglo American acquired an additional 40% stake for $5.1 billion, increasing their overall stake to 85%. This came at a time of increased labour strikes and international attention to Oppenheimer's involvement in conflict diamonds. Anglo American then sold a 24.5% share in its main Chilean copper unit, Anglo American Sur, to Japan's Mitsubishi Corporation for $5.39 billion, paid with a promissory note due on 10 November 2011. With this deal, the Anglo American Sur complex was valued at $22 billion. By selling a 24.5% stake to Mitsubishi Corporation Anglo American successfully obstructed Codelco's option to purchase 49% as the option was reportedly only valid as long as Anglo American held 100% of the company. This option dated to the privatization of Disputada de Las Condes in 1977. Codelco did however negotiate a 20% ownership of Anglo American Sur in late 2012 and Anglo American reduced its ownership share from 75.5% to 50.1%.

In November 2012, Anglo American completed the sale of steel maker Scaw South Africa and its connected companies for a total of R3.4 billion in cash.

In July 2014, Anglo American said it was disposing of its 50% shareholding in Lafarge Tarmac, a building materials joint venture, to cement maker Lafarge SA for a value of not less than £885 million ($1.5 billion); the sale was subsequently completed in July 2015 for $1.6 billion. In October 2014, Anglo American's Minas-Rio iron ore project in Brazil began operating and shipping ore.

In July 2015, Anglo American announced that it would cut 53,000 jobs (35% of their workforce) and that in the first half of 2015, they had a financial loss of US$3 billion. In early December 2015, the company announced that, as part of a restructure, it would be cutting a further 85,000 mining jobs, nearly two-thirds of its work force of 135,000, worldwide. It also announced the consolidation of six of its divisions into three businesses, while dividend payouts to investors were also suspended for a year. The company also had its Dawson, Foxleigh and Callide coal mines in Central Queensland, as well as its Dartbrook coal mine in the Hunter Valley in New South Wales, put up for sale as its shares dropped to a record low on the London Stock Exchange, falling by more than 12 per cent.

In March 2017, British Indian industrialist Anil Agarwal purchased 11% of the company through his family trust Volcan. In September, he took the holding to 20% through another purchase worth about $1.5 billion. In April 2017, the company sold its Eskom-linked thermal coal operations in South Africa for $166 million, marking an important step in the mining giant's strategic overhaul to sharpen its focus on three commodities.

In October 2019, Anglo American announced a partnership with French energy company Engie and engineering firm First Mode to develop the world's largest hydrogen-powered mine haul truck.

=== 2020 - Present ===
In January 2020, Anglo American made a 5.5p per share offer to buy a polyhalite fertiliser project (in North Yorkshire, England) from Sirius Minerals for £400m. In salvaging the financially troubled project, Anglo American envisages spending around £230m to keep construction going. The sale was approved by shareholders in March 2020.

In April 2021, Anglo American announced the demerger of Thungela Resources, which will own a series of significant South African thermal coal assets, in order to eliminate the risk of clean-up liabilities.

In May 2022, Anglo American and First Mode unveiled the world’s largest hydrogen powered mine haul truck at Mogalakwena PGM Mine in northeast South Africa. The project, which is expected to be fully implemented by 2026, is a first step in making eight of the company’s mines carbon neutral by 2040. The company has set a target of getting all of its operations to that status by 2040. President of the Republic of South Africa, Cyril Ramaphosa was present at the launch and stated, "Developing the hydrogen economy is a strategic priority for our country."

BHP made an offer to acquire the company for £31 billion in April 2024; however, the offer was rejected by the company as "highly unattractive". In May 2024, a revised offer was made by BHP and subsequently rejected by Anglo American.

In November 2024, Peabody Energy announced plans to acquire the metallurgical coal assets of Anglo American for $3.78 billion. However, the following August, Peabody terminated the deal because a fire at Anglo American's Moranbah North coal mine constituted a material adverse change. Peabody sought to renegotiate for a lower price, but the attempt failed.

The platinum mining division, was demerged from Anglo American as Valterra Platinum on 31 May 2025. At the time of its independence and listing, Valterra was the largest platinum mining company in the world by value and fourth by volume.

=== Teck Resources merger ===
On 9 September 2025, Anglo American and Teck Resources announced they had reached an agreement to combine the two companies in a merger of equals to form the Anglo Teck group, a global critical minerals champion and the world's second largest copper producer, headquartered in Canada and expected to offer investors more than 70% exposure to copper. Considering the previous takeover attempt of Anglo American by BHP, Radio Bío-Bío opined that with this merger Anglo American had gone "from prey to predator".

The merger is thought to be particularly impactful for the adjoining copper mines of Collahuasi and Quebrada Blanca which could easily integrate operations if owned by the same company. The merger of operations of these two mines depend however on its approval by Glencore which owns 44% of Collahuasi. (Note: Glencore itself had tried a hostile takeover of Teck Resources in 2023.)

In late November 2025, Canadian Industry Minister Melanie Joly warned that Anglo American's pledges were not enough, and said she thought Canadians should get more out of the merger. Joly is responsible for enforcing Canada's foreign-investment laws, which require government approval for foreign-led mergers and acquisition activity.

== Operations ==
Anglo American is focused on copper, premium iron ore and crop nutrients, following a portfolio simplification program. Its continuing operations also include manganese and diamonds, through De Beers, in which it owns an 85% share and which it is seeking to divest. In 2025, Anglo American produced 695,200 tonnes of copper and 60.8 million tonnes of premium iron ore, and its continuing operations generated revenue of US$18.5 billion and Underlying EBITDA of US$6.4 billion. Its 2026 copper production guidance is 700,000–760,000 tonnes, and it produced 518,500 tonnes in the first nine months of the year. It had about 43,000 employees at the end of 2025.

=== Portfolio simplification ===
In May 2025, Anglo American completed the demerger of Valterra Platinum (formerly Anglo American Platinum), and in September 2025 it sold the remaining 19.9% holding it had retained. It has agreed to sell its Australian steelmaking coal business to Dhilmar Limited for up to US$3.875 billion in cash, a deal it expects to complete by the first quarter of 2027, and to sell its nickel business in Brazil to MMG for up to US$500 million, which awaits European Commission approval. A formal sales process for De Beers is under way.

In September 2025, Anglo American agreed to merge with Teck Resources in a merger of equals to form Anglo Teck. Shareholders of both companies approved the merger in December 2025, and final regulatory approval is expected between September 2026 and March 2027.

=== Superconducting Quantum Interference Device ===
Anglo American, along with De Beers, backed the manufacturing of a superconducting quantum interference device (SQUID) to help improve the sensitivity of exploration surveys. Anglo American established Boart Products South Africa Limited in 1936 (later named Boart International) to turn the company's stockpile of boart, or low-grade natural diamonds, into drilling products. This initiative resulted in the development of the first mechanically set diamond drill bit and later led to additional research into cutting and abrasive tools.

=== Minas-Rio Project ===
In December 2010, following delays and high costs, Anglo American gained a key licence from the Brazilian government that would allow work to start on the Minas-Rio iron ore project. Production was initially expected to be 26.5 million tonnes per year and would see iron ore sent through a 525 km slurry pipeline to the Port of Açu. Shipments of iron ore concentrate began in 2014, and the operation produced 24.8 million tonnes in 2025.

In 2024, Anglo American completed a transaction with Vale to combine Vale's adjacent Serra da Serpentina iron ore resource with its Minas-Rio operation. Vale transferred Serpentina and paid US$157.5 million in cash, subject to adjustments, for a 15% shareholding in the enlarged Minas-Rio, and has an option to acquire a further 15% if certain events relating to a future expansion occur. Anglo American continues to control, manage and operate Minas-Rio.

=== Quellaveco Copper Mine ===
In July 2018, Anglo American announced that it would spend $5.3 billion on developing the Quellaveco copper mine in Peru, which the company acquired in 1992, with the Japanese conglomerate Mitsubishi funding 40% of the total cost. As part of the project, Anglo American also committed 650 million soles ($195 million) towards local community developments projects in Moquegua, where the Quellaveco mine is located. Anglo American holds a 60% interest in the mine and Mitsubishi holds 40%. Commercial copper production was achieved in September 2022, and the mine produced 306,300 tonnes of copper in 2024. Anglo American's 2026 guidance for copper production in Peru is 310,000–340,000 tonnes.

== Accusations of health impacts ==
=== Alleged lead poisoning in Zambia ===
In October 2020, Anglo American was accused of being responsible for lead poisoning in possibly over 100,000 people near Kabwe mine, which the company operated from 1925 - 1974. Numerous studies since 1971 have shown that people around Kabwe mine have been poisoned by lead. A 2015 study found that 100% of children tested in the area had lead in their blood exceeding CDC guidelines.

Plaintiffs said the lead originated from the lead mine and smelter, and stated “generations of children have been poisoned by the operations of the Kabwe mine...which caused widespread contamination of the soil, dust, water and vegetation.” Anglo American denies these allegations and has accused its successor ZCCM, which operated the mine after its nationalization in 1974.

The class action certification hearing was dismissed by the lower court in Johannesburg in 2023, calling the case "an unmanageable class action", stating that every one of roughly 140,000 people would have to prove they suffered from illness caused by lead poisoning. The ruling was appealed in November 2025.

=== Cerrejon Mine in Colombia ===
In 2013, the companies involved in the Cerrejón coal mine in Colombia, were accused of increasing illness in approximately 13,000 people living close to the mine. Anglo American was also accused of failing to compensate people who had been displaced by its expansion. In September 2020, a UN human rights expert advised that Colombia discontinue the mine citing environmental and human rights concerns. In January 2021, the OECD launched an investigation into Cerrejón over human rights and environmental concerns. In February 2021, Anglo American announced plans to divest the Cerrejon mine by 2024. In June 2021, Anglo sued the Colombian government for preventing the development of the La Puente coal pit.

== Carbon footprint ==
For 2023, Anglo American reported Scope 1 and Scope 2 emissions of 12.5 Mt CO2e.

Anglo American's CO2e emissions (Direct Scope 1 + Indirect Scope 2) (in megatonnes)
2014	2015	2016	2017	2018	2019	2020	2021	2022	2023
17.3	18.3	17.9	18.0	16.2	17.7	16.1	14.8	13.3	12.5

The company has committed to carbon neutrality in Scope 1 and 2 emissions by 2040, and 50% reductions in the Scope 3 emissions relative to a 2020 baseline.

== See also ==
- List of mining companies
- List of companies traded on the JSE
- List of companies of South Africa
- Economy of South Africa
- Mineral Policy Institute
- Extractive Industries Transparency Initiative
- International Council on Mining and Metals
- United Nations Global Compact
