= First Mode =

British decarbonization company

First Mode Holdings, Inc.
- Company type: Subsidiary
- Industry: Industrial services
- Founded: March 14, 2018; 7 years ago in Seattle, Washington, U.S.
- Founder: Rhae Adams; Spencer Anunsen; Colin Bateson; Riley Chapin; Krunal Desai; Brian Geddes; Peter Illsley; Maggie Scholtz; Josh Sweere; Chris Voorhees; Josh Weiss
- Area served: Worldwide
- Key people: Julian Soles (CEO)
- Products: Hybrid powerplants; Vehicle retrofit kits; Liquid hydrogen refueling stations
- Number of employees: 175 (2024)
- Website: firstmode.com

First Mode is a multinational decarbonization company that designs, manufactures, and distributes hybrid battery systems and hydrogen fuel cell technologies for heavy duty mining and rail vehicles, along with hydrogen refueling equipment.

The company has operations in Australia, Europe, North America and South America. It won Fast Company’s 2023 World Changing Ideas awards for the creation of the world's largest operating hydrogen fuel cell-powered vehicle.

== History ==
First Mode was founded on March 14, 2018 in the Seattle, Washington area by 11 former members of asteroid mining company Planetary Resources. It partnered with mining corporation Anglo American plc in 2019, signing a three-year agreement to develop a diesel alternative for the company's fleet of mining haul trucks.

In 2022, First Mode and Anglo American debuted the world's first and largest hydrogen-powered mine haul truck at the Mogalakwena platinum mine in South Africa with a converted Komatsu 930E Haulpak truck. It successfully completed operational trials in May 2023.

In January 2023, First Mode and Anglo American announced the signing of a $200 million binding agreement to combine First Mode with the Anglo American nuGen team, thereby making Anglo American the majority shareholder.

The two companies also signed a supply agreement for First Mode to provide Anglo American with several additional hybrid powerplant retrofit kits for mining haul trucks. These are slated to be demonstrated on Komatsu 930E and 830E platforms in early 2024.

In December 2024, the firm filed for Chapter 11 bankruptcy protection after being unable to find a buyer for its assets. It plans to sell its assets and wind down operations through support from Angelo American.

In 2025, Cummins announced that it would acquire First Mode, including its assets, the hybrid mining and rail product lines, the intellectual property and the operations in Australia, the United States and Chile which will operate under Cummins' Power Systems segment. On February 11, it was announced that the purchase of the company had been completed.

== See also ==
- Carbon neutrality
- Climate change mitigation
- Greenhouse gas emissions
- Energy transition
- Energy Efficiency
- Carbon footprint
- Low-carbon economy
- Sustainable Development Goals
