= Julian Ogilvie Thompson =

South African businessman (1934–2023)

- Born: 27 January 1934; Cape Town, Cape Province, Union of South Africa
- Died: 11 August 2023 (aged 89); Johannesburg, Gauteng, South Africa
- Education: Diocesan College
- Alma mater: University of Cape Town; Worcester College, Oxford
- Occupation: Businessman
- Spouse: Tessa Mary Brand
- Parent(s): Newton Ogilvie Thompson; Eve Thompson

Julian Ogilvie Thompson (27 January 1934 – 11 August 2023) was a South African businessman who was chairman of De Beers and the Anglo American mining company.

== Early life ==
Julian Ogilvie Thompson was born on 27 January 1934 in Cape Town, then in the Union of South Africa. His father, Newton Ogilvie Thompson, was a lawyer and jurist who served as Chief Justice of South Africa from 1971 to 1974. After attending Diocesan College from 1943 to 1952, Ogilvie Thompson spent a year studying at the University of Cape Town, before entering Worcester College, Oxford in 1953, where he was a Rhodes Scholar.

== Career ==
Ogilvie Thompson became personal assistant to Harry Oppenheimer in 1957, and joined the Anglo American finance division in 1961. He went on to manage and head this division and also joined the De Beers board in 1966.

Ogilvie Thompson was appointed an executive director of Anglo American in 1971 and a vice chairman of Barclays National Bank, former First National Bank, in 1977. He succeeded Harry Oppenheimer as chairman of Minorco in 1982 and as chairman of De Beers in 1985. He succeeded Gavin Relly as chairman of Anglo American in 1990 and retired as chairman of De Beers in 1997 to become non-executive deputy chairman. After leading the 1999 merger of Anglo American and Minorco, Ogilvie Thompson became its chairman and CEO. He was succeeded by Tony Trahar in 2000 but continued as non-executive chairman. He resigned as deputy chairman of De Beers in 2002, but continued to be a non-executive director.

Ogilvie Thompson was a member of the Board of Trustees of the Mandela Rhodes Foundation.

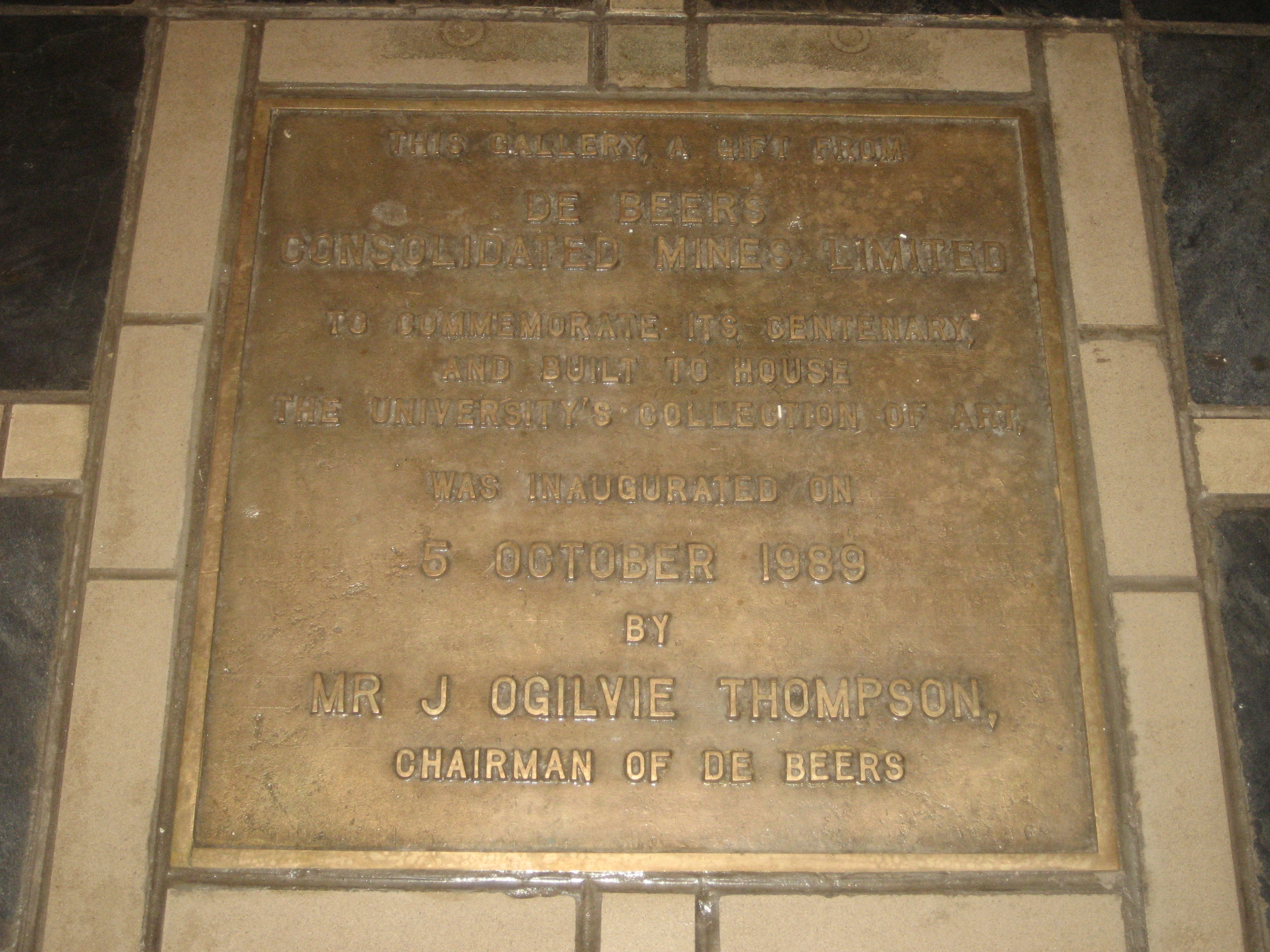
Plaque unveiled by Ogilvie Thompson (De Beers Centenary Art Gallery, University of Fort Hare)

== Personal life ==
Ogilvie Thompson married The Honourable Tessa Mary Brand, daughter of Thomas Brand, 4th Viscount Hampden in 1956. Tessa Mary Brand died on 14 February 2020 aged 85.

Julian Ogilvie Thompson died in Johannesburg on 11 August 2023, at the age of 89.
