= Gavin Relly =

South African businessman

Gavin Relly (Born 1926 in Cape Town, Cape Province, Union of South Africa – died 10 January 1999 in Hermanus, Western Cape, South Africa) was a South African businessman and former chairman of Anglo American.

== Early life ==
His grandfather was Sir Walter Stanford, who argued strongly but unsuccessfully for enfranchisement for native peoples regardless of their race or colour at the National Convention of 1909, which led to the creation of the Union of South Africa under the terms of the South Africa Act 1909. Relly was educated at Diocesan College and Trinity College, Oxford before serving in Italy during the Second World War. He then worked for Sir de Villiers Graaff, leader of the United Party. He joined Anglo American in 1949 and became the private secretary of Harry Oppenheimer and later of Ernest Oppenheimer. He would later develop the company's gold mines in the Free State and oversaw the creation of Highveld Steel and Vanadium. He became chairman of Anglo American in 1983.

He led a group of South African businessmen who met with the banned African National Congress's representative Oliver Tambo in Lusaka, Zambia in 1985, resisting the pressures from the then South African government under State President of South Africa P.W. Botha. He was succeeded by Julian Ogilvie Thompson in 1990.

== Death ==
Relly died of complications from cardiac surgery and was survived by his wife Jane, and children Janis, Georgina and Giles.
