= Minas-Rio =

Iron mine in Brazil

Minas-Rio is an iron ore mining project in Minas Gerais state, Brazil. It is one of the world's largest mining projects, and is initially expected to export 26.5 million tonnes of iron ore in 2013, through a 525 km slurry pipeline to a port at Açu; production potential is 53 Mtpa or higher.

The project was bought by Anglo American PLC, which is facing high costs. The mine has certified reserves of 4.6 billion tonnes of itabirite.

There have been delays in starting the project, but in December 2010, Anglo American obtained a key license needed from Brazilian government before mining could start.

The mine began operating and shipping ore in 2014.

== See also ==
- EBX Group
