= Mineral Policy Institute =

Australian environmental organization

The Mineral Policy Institute is an Australian-based non-governmental organisation that specialises in preventing environmentally and socially destructive mining, minerals and energy projects in Australia, Asia and the Pacific. The institute as formed in 1995 in response to the internationalisation of Australia's mineral industry and requests for assistance from overseas. The institute works with other organisations, including Greenpeace to protest violations of the Basel Convention related to illegal dumping.
