= Black powder in gas pipelines =

Black powder is an industry name for the abrasive, reactive particulate contamination present in all gas and hydrocarbon fluid transmission lines. Black powder ranges from light brown to black, and the mineral makeup varies per production field around the world.

Black powder forms throughout the pipeline process; from producing formations, through well bores, into gathering lines, in reservoirs for fluid separation, and along transmission pipelines. After refinement, black powder continues to build in the gas plants and refineries, storage reservoirs, and finally through to the end user. Black powder is a composite of iron oxides, iron sulfides, varying dirt such as silica and calcium as well as chloride, sodium, and other material particulate.

== Sources ==
Black powder results from chemical and bacterial reactions within hydrocarbon systems. Bacterially, sulfate-reducing bacteria and acid-producing bacteria are dependent on the reaction of water and iron to form the hydrogen sulfides that cause oxidization and in turn black powder. Chemically, the three primary catalysts of black powder contamination are moisture, H2S, and temperature or pressure variance. Within pipeline transmission systems, ever-present moisture catalyzes bacterial and chemical corrosion of the carbon steel walls within pipelines and storage reservoirs. In refineries, process plants, and storage reservoirs, if H2S is present, it will corrode all carbon steel components creating more black powder. Severe temperature and pressure changes occur throughout the pipeline at city gates, processing plants and refineries, precipitating iron oxides, iron sulfides, and sulfur from the hydrocarbon gas or liquids. These particles have an affinity for themselves and throughout the rest of the pipeline process will reach measurable levels instantly causing clouds of black powder in the flow.

=== Chemical corrosion ===
When moisture is present corrosion occurs and the byproduct is very abrasive particles of iron sulfide and iron oxide. These two components are kin in that the sulfide will form and reside in the pipe in the absence of oxygen, but will convert to iron oxides in the presence of oxygen. The oxygen does not have to be free oxygen, but can come from the breakdown of other compounds containing oxygen atoms.

The majority of the black powder composition is ferrous or magnetic in nature. Other sources of black powder are from mill scale from the pipe manufacturing process through high temperature oxidation of steel and flash rust created when the pipe is hydro tested.

=== Bacteria influenced corrosion ===
Microbes found in piping and geologic structures are known to produce iron sulfides and pipe corrosion. The most common microbes to be found in gas pipelines that can produce iron sulfides are:

1. Desulfovibrio desulfuricans (sulfur producing)
2. Clostridium (acid producing bacteria)

The viability of microbes to corrode piping interior surfaces depends upon the same source materials as sulfide chemical corrosion, that is, water and iron. Furthermore, the microbes depend upon short-chain volatile fatty acids (VFA) as a nutrient source. These are nearly always found where water exists in a closed piping environment.

=== Erosion ===
The flow of a gas or hydrocarbon liquid down a pipe line causes erosion as a result of the contact between the pipe wall and the medium being transported. The main factors that increase erosion are the flow rate and the contamination levels present in the gas or hydrocarbon fluid. The degree of erosion increases as the black powder contamination levels increase as it flows down the pipeline.

== Why black powder is a problem ==
As the majority of transmission lines, transport systems and storage reservoirs are manufactured with soft carbon steel, all stages of a pipeline are vulnerable to erosion of pipeline components in the transmission line by exposure to black powder. Iron sulfides and iron oxides significantly damage components from the origin of the pipeline to the final product delivery because prior to precipitation, they are at and below sub-micron levels, therefore undetectable when passing through sensors and meters. Black powder, at this size, damages pump seals, meters, valves, and compressor components because it plates out and wears on exchangers, trays, orifices, and valves. These compromised components and instrumentation, lead to flow restriction and disrupted pressure boundaries.

== Solution ==
Cyclones, separators, cone and basket strainers with fine mesh are used to reduce black powder contamination levels but are not efficient to sub-micron levels and are subject to plugging and loss of structural integrity.

For hydrocarbon condensates, light crude or heavy crude and refined products, very little filtration is utilized. Damage to flow meters, valves and pumps is very costly. Traditional filtration used in these applications is mesh screens in cone strainer and basket strainer formats that are designed to stop contamination in excess of 100 microns.

=== Industry standard ===
Presently the majority of measures employed to deal with black powder are reactive not proactive such as pigging and chemical cleaners resulting in significant down time and costs.

Present proactive measures are to treat sour gas pipelines with corrosion inhibitors, employ lined pipe and when possible replacing the steel pipe with plastic pipe.

For gas pipe lines, traditional filtration consisting of cartridge filter elements manufactured from paper, fiberglass, or polymer media with various rated filtration capabilities are employed to reduce black powder levels. These technologies are inefficient because they plug off quickly and require costly change outs resulting in reduced production. These technologies present flow restriction that cause stress on the pumping or compressor systems requiring increased horse power to maintain flow.

=== New technology ===
BPS new rare-earth magnetic technology provides proactive management practices to reduce the contamination levels, mitigating the overall negative impact of black powder on pipeline operational integrity. The solution to this problem is to employ magnetic separation technology in strategic locations throughout the pipeline system, refineries, chemical plants, city gates, and loading facilities.

Over the past 15 years, significant improvements in rare earth magnetic technology have created the ability to use magnetic fields as a filter or separator medium which is environmentally and user friendly, highly efficient, and cost effective.

Through utilizing black powder separators in a modular format for full-flow gas and hydrocarbon fluid pipelines that remove ferrous and non-ferrous black powder contamination. This is accomplished by two methods:

1. Entrapment of the iron particles mixing with the non-ferrous during flow.
2. Naturally occurring static charge created by the flow of gas or fluids through pipes, referred to as static adhesion. The ferrous and non-ferrous particles are charged and marry up when they contact in flow. When exposed to BPS radial magnetic fields, they attract and trap to the magnetic separator rod surface.

In natural gas and oil pipelines, binder materials such as paraffins, glycols, and asphaltenes marry up with fine ferrous and sand particles trapping to the magnetic fields when passing through the black powder separators.

The black powder contamination trapped on the magnetic separators is easily removed and stored in mineral bags. When the composition is primarily iron sulfides, there is opportunity for auto-ignition (smolders and flames), precautions must be taken to saturate the black powder with a chemical to neutralize it.

Removing and monitoring the quantities of the black powder in strategic locations along the transmission lines will lessen the erosion factor and may act as a monitoring tool for pipe wall life cycle.

Prime locations for the employment of black powder separators to reduce contamination levels is loading and offloading of product at port facilities, prior to LNG plants, refineries, gas chemical plants, metering stations, and power plants. Cleaner product entering these facilities will improve production and lower operational costs by reducing premature process equipment component wear.
