= Slurry pipeline =

Pipeline used to move ores mixed with water

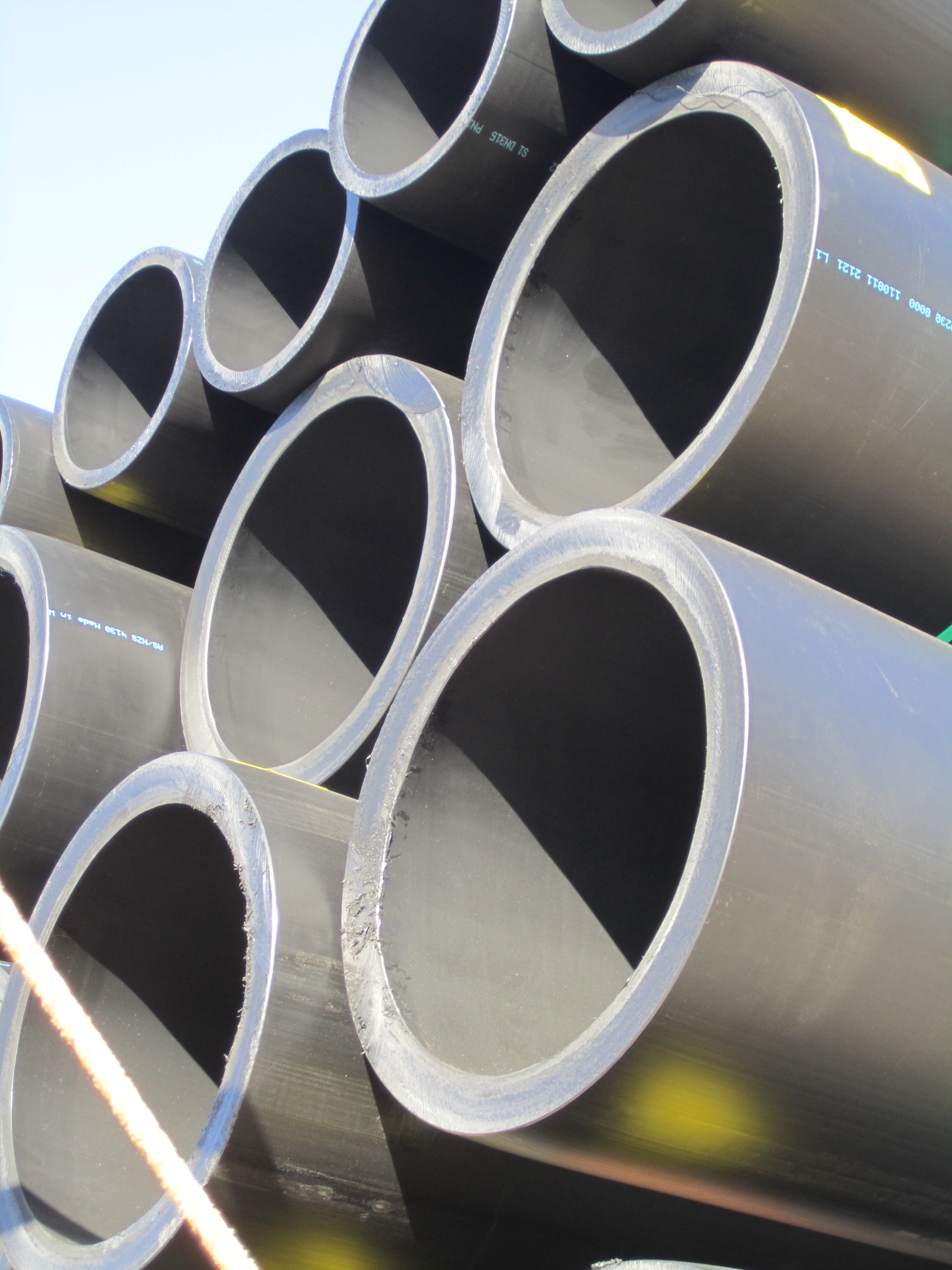
Thick walled HDPE Pipes for slurry application

A slurry pipeline is a specially engineered pipeline used to move ores, such as coal or iron, or mining waste, called tailings, over long distances. A mixture of the ore concentrate and water, called slurry, is pumped to its destination and the water is filtered out. Due to the abrasive properties of slurry, the pipelines can be lined with high-density polyethylene (HDPE), or manufactured completely from HDPE Pipe, although this requires a very thick pipe wall. Slurry pipelines are used as an alternative to railroad transportation when mines are located in remote, inaccessible areas, often requiring complex slurry pipeline design to avoid unnecessary wear.

Canadian researchers at the University of Alberta are investigating the use of slurry pipelines to move agricultural and forestry wastes from dispersed sources to centralized bio-fuel plants. Over distances of 100 kilometers pipeline transport of biomass can be viable provided it is used in processes that can accept very wet feed-stocks such as hydrothermal liquefaction or ethanol fermentation. Compared to an equivalently sized oil pipeline, a biomass slurry pipeline would carry around 8% of the energy.

== Process ==
The concentrate of the ore is mixed with water and then pumped over a long distance to a port where it can be shipped for further processing. At the end of the pipeline, the material is separated from the [slurry] in a filter press to remove the water. This water is usually subjected to a waste treatment process before disposal or return to the mine. Slurry pipelines offer an economic advantage over railroad transport and much less noise disturbance to the environment, particularly when mines are in extremely remote areas.

Pipelines must be suitably engineered to resist abrasion from the solids as well as corrosion from the soil. Some of these pipelines are lined with high-density polyethylene (HDPE).

Typical materials that are transferred using slurry pipelines include coal, copper, iron, and phosphate concentrates, limestone, lead, zinc, nickel, bauxite and oil sands.

Slurry pipelines are also used to transport tailings from a mineral processing plant after the ore has been processed in order to dispose of the remaining rocks or clays.

For oil sand plants, a mixture of oil sand and water may be pumped over a long distance to release the bitumen by ablation. These pipelines are also called hydrotransport pipelines.

== History ==
Early modern slurry pipelines include The Ohio 'Consolidation' coal slurry pipeline (1957) and the Kensworth to Rugby limestone slurry pipeline (1965)

The 85 km Savage River Slurry pipeline in Tasmania, Australia, was possibly the world's first slurry pipeline to transport iron ore when it was built in 1967. It includes a 366m bridge span at 167m above the Savage River. It carries iron ore slurry from the Savage River open cut mine owned by Australian Bulk Minerals and was still operational as of 2011.

== Planned projects ==
One of the longest slurry pipelines was to be the proposed ETSI pipeline, to transport coal from Wyoming to Louisiana over a distance of 1036 miles (1675 km). It was never commissioned. It is anticipated that in the next few years some long distance slurry pipelines will be constructed in Australia and South America where mineral deposits are often a few hundred kilometers away from shipping ports.

A 525 km slurry pipeline is planned for the Minas-Rio iron ore mine in Brazil.

Slurry pipelines are also being considered to desilt or remove silts from deposits behind dams in man-made lakes. After the Hurricane Katrina disaster there were proposals to remedy the environment by pumping silt to the shore. Proposals have also been made to de-silt Lake Nubia-Nasser in Egypt and Sudan by slurry pipelines, as Egypt is now deprived of 95% of its alluvium, which used to arrive every year. These projects to remedy the environment might alleviate one of the major problems associated with large dams and man-made lakes.

ESSAR Steel India Limited owns two >250 km slurry pipelines in India; the Kirandul-Vishakhapatnam (slurry pipeline) and Dabuna-Paradeep pipeline.

== See also ==
- Coal slurry pipeline
- Edward J. Wasp
