= IR welding =

Welding technique

IR welding is a welding technique that uses a non-contact heating method to melt and fuse thermoplastic parts together using the energy from infrared radiation. The process was first developed in the late 1900s, but due to the high capital cost of IR equipment the process was not commonly applied in industry until prices dropped in the 1990s. IR welding typically uses a range of wavelengths from 800 to 11,000 nm on the electromagnetic spectrum to heat, melt, and fuse the interface between two plastic parts through the absorption and conversion of the IR energy into heat. Laser welding is a similar joining process that applies IR radiation at a single wavelength.

There are many different welding techniques that use IR heating, with the three major modes being surface heating, through transmission IR welding (TTIr), and IR staking. A variety of heating configurations have been applied to these techniques such as scanning, continuous illumination, and mask welding. Advantages such as faster and controllable non-contact heating applicable for a wide range of simple or complex part geometries sets IR welding apart from other forms of plastic welding. CO detectors, IV bags, and brake transmission lines are just a few of the many products that utilize IR welds.

== History ==
IR welding is categorized as a form thermal plastic welding alongside hot gas welding, hot tool welding, and extrusion welding. Although infrared radiation was first discovered in the 1800s, IR was not applied as a source of heat until the beginning of WWII when it was found to be more effective than the fuel convection ovens of that time. IR radiation was first tested for the welding of thermoplastic polymers in the late 1900s, but the process was relatively new and not fully understood. IR welding systems offered faster heating times than the other forms of thermal welding, but the high capital costs limited its development. With a decrease in the price of equipment in the 1990s, IR welding has become more popular in the industry.

== Physics of IR welding ==
Electromagnetic spectrum

Electromagnetic wave interactions

IR welding typically uses wavelengths from 800 to 11,000 nm on the electromagnetic spectrum. Plastics interact with IR radiation through reflection, transmission, and absorption. Incident IR radiation can either be reflected off the surface of the plastic, transmitted through the plastic, or absorbed into the plastic as other forms of energy including thermal energy. The ratio of these three interactions depends on the wavelength of the IR radiation and the receiving plastic's properties. Amorphous plastics are generally optically clear and can transmit almost all incident IR radiation. For this reason they are commonly used in TTIr. Semi-crystalline plastics can diffuse incident IR radiation between the amorphous and crystalline boundaries, reducing the transmittance and increasing the absorbance of the material. The higher absorptivity results in more heat generation for a given IR source. Additives such as clarifying agents can be used increase a plastic's transmittance while dies and pigments can be used increase the absorbance of a material. Increasing amounts of these additives can decrease the strength of both the material and the welded joint.

The closer the IR radiation source, the higher incidence efficiency on the material. IR radiation is most effective when directing radiation normal to the part. Radiation energy always affects the surface of a part while the depth of penetration that the energy can reach is dependent on the plastic's crystallinity.

== Equipment ==
=== IR Sources ===
Potential IR welding sources include quartz lamps and ceramic heaters which can generate a wide range of IR wavelengths. Laser welding employs IR sources that operate at a single wavelength such as CO_{2} lasers, Nd:YAG lasers, laser diodes. The equipment selected for each welding process stems from the type of radiation produced. Quartz lamps produce wavelengths of around 1,000 to 5,000 nm and ceramic heaters produce wavelengths of around 5,000 to 10,000 nm.

=== Attachments ===
P-wave technology utilizes an IR lamp and a pre-placed focusing device such as an IR transducer or film that can filter and focus IR radiation at a desired wavelength and increased intensity within a selected area to improve weld penetration with minimal surface damage. This method allows improved IR welding of polymers with higher melting temperatures such as most fluoropolymers and polyketones.

== IR welding techniques ==
The three major welding techniques used in the industry today include surface heating, through transmission IR welding, and IR staking. All IR welding techniques contain the following six basic steps in some form:

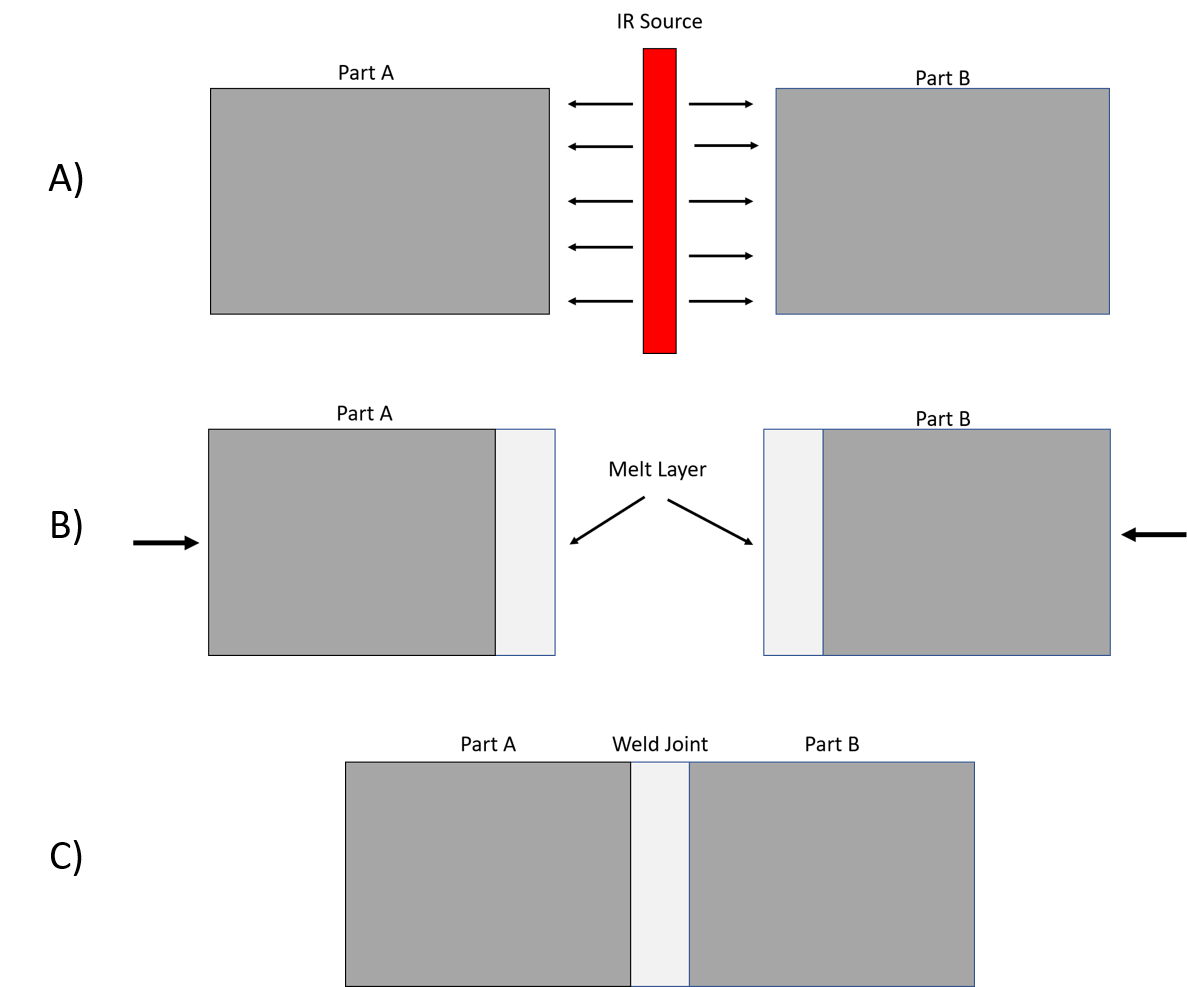
Basic steps of the IR surface heating mode

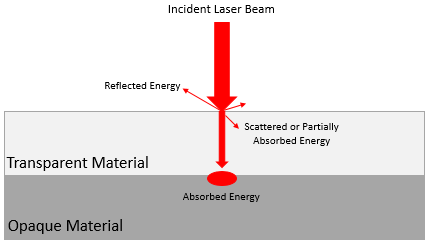
TTIr Welding Diagram

1. Loading of parts into the welding system that will hold the parts in place
2. Insertion of IR source in front of the face of each part that will welded together
3. Application of IR radiation to melt a thin layer of plastic on the surface of each part
4. Change-over in which the IR source is removed from the face of each part
5. Clamping of the parts to join the melted surfaces together under pressure as they cool and solidify
6. Unloading of the parts after the weld has been made

=== Surface Heating ===
Surface heating includes heating and melting of the interface between plastic parts with IR radiation and forcing the parts together into a molten joint that solidifies as one part. This process can be split into 3 phases as shown in the figure to the right: A) Loading of parts, insertion of the IR source, and IR application. B) Change-over with the removal of IR source and clamping of the parts to join them. C) Unloading of the parts after the weld was made.

=== Through Transmission IR Welding (TTIr) ===
TTIr welding is the joining of an IR transparent part to a second part such that the IR radiation travels through the transparent part and heat the surface of the second part as shown in the figure to the right. IR wavelengths are generally within 800 to 1050 nm. To make a transparent part absorbent to IR radiation, the addition of dies or colorants such as carbon black can be used. Highly absorbent thermoplastic films can be placed at the joint to receive the IR radiation and melt the interface during welding. Using these methods, TTIr welds can be completed between parts of both the same or different materials.

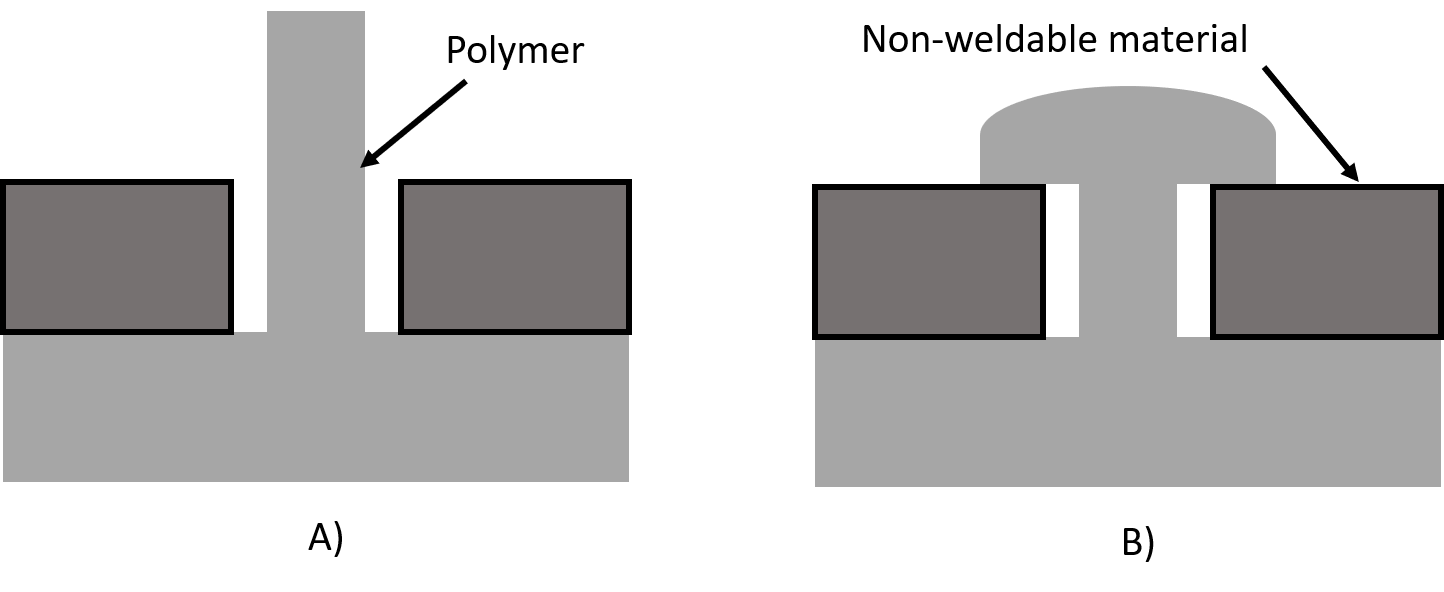
IR Staking

=== IR Staking ===
IR staking includes the localized welding of a thermoplastic stud or stake from one part into the cavity of a non-weldable part to form a mechanical fastener. As shown in the figure to the right, the polymer part and non-weldable part are first placed together (A), then the projecting polymer is melted and formed around the non-weldable part to fasten the two together (B). The stud can be heated through directed TTIr when pre-placed within the cavity of an IR transparent part, then melted to deform it into a button shape required to fill the cavity before solidifying. Surface IR radiation can also be used to soften a plastic stud which is then pressed into a button-shaped die to form a head before cooling and solidifying.

== Heating Configurations ==
IR systems generally rely on one of three surface heating methods: scanning, continuous illumination, and mask welding.

=== Scanning ===
Scanning involves the movement of an IR beam across the surface of a part using either an automated motion system or galvanic mirrors. Equipment is limited by the speed of movements across the part's surface to maintain uniform temperatures on the surface. In TTIr welding, scanning allows the un-melted portion of the part to act as a mechanical stop in order to maintain the joint gap between the two parts.

=== Continuous illumination ===
Continuous illumination uses more than one IR radiation source to heat the entire joint interface at the same time. Part tolerances or fit is not as crucial with this method as the entire surface will be melted before welding. This method is useful when welding parts with complex geometries, employing the multiple IR sources to evenly heat all forms of joint interfaces.

=== Mask welding ===
Similar to continuous illumination, mask welding utilizes multiple IR sources to completely illuminate a joint interface while placing an IR radiation mask over the parts to control which regions will form a melt layer.

== Materials ==
Below is a list of materials well known for their IR weldability:

- Polycarbonate (PC)
- Poly(methyl methacrylate) (PMMA)
- Ethylene vinyl alcohol (EVOH)
- Acrylic
- Polystyrene (PS)
- Acrylonitrile butadiene stryrene (ABS)
- Polyvinyl chloride (PVC)
- Polyethylene (PE)
- Polypropylene (PP)
- Polyketone (PK)
- Elastomers
- Polyamide (PA)
- Polyoxymethylene (POM or Acetal)
- Polytetrafluoroethylene (PTFE)
- High density polyethylene (HDPE)
- Glass fiber reinforced polyethylene (PPE)
- Polybutylene terephthalate (PBT)
- Glass fiber reinforced polyether sulfone (PES)

== Advantages / Disadvantages ==
=== Advantages ===
- Fast heating and cycle time than other thermal plastic welding processes
- Non-contact heating on the weld interface prevents plastic parts from sticking to the heat source, as seen in hot plate welding
- Controlled heat affected zone for reduced flash than seen in hot plate welding
- Minimal contamination risk with prevention of production of particulate than other thermal plastic welding processes
- Continuous and easily automated process
- Potential for higher joint strengths and lower residual stresses than other thermal plastic welding processes
- Cost-effective in comparison to laser welding
- Direct heat transfer to parts allows for maximum energy efficiency and fast response time with lower weight equipment than other thermal plastic welding processes
- Well suited for welding high temperature thermoplastics in comparison to hot plate welding

=== Disadvantages ===
- IR welding parts and systems are more expensive than other thermal plastic welding processes
- IR welding can only weld materials susceptible to IR waves and part interfaces exposed to IR radiation
- Prolonged heating may cause material degradation or vapor oxidation entrapment

== Applications ==
New joining technologies using IR welding are critical for fabricating complex parts and assemblies at high speeds and low costs. Although IR plastic welding has many advantages over other types of plastic welding, limitations such as equipment costs and susceptible materials properties reduce the amount of industrial applications of the method. A few examples of current industrial applications are shown below:

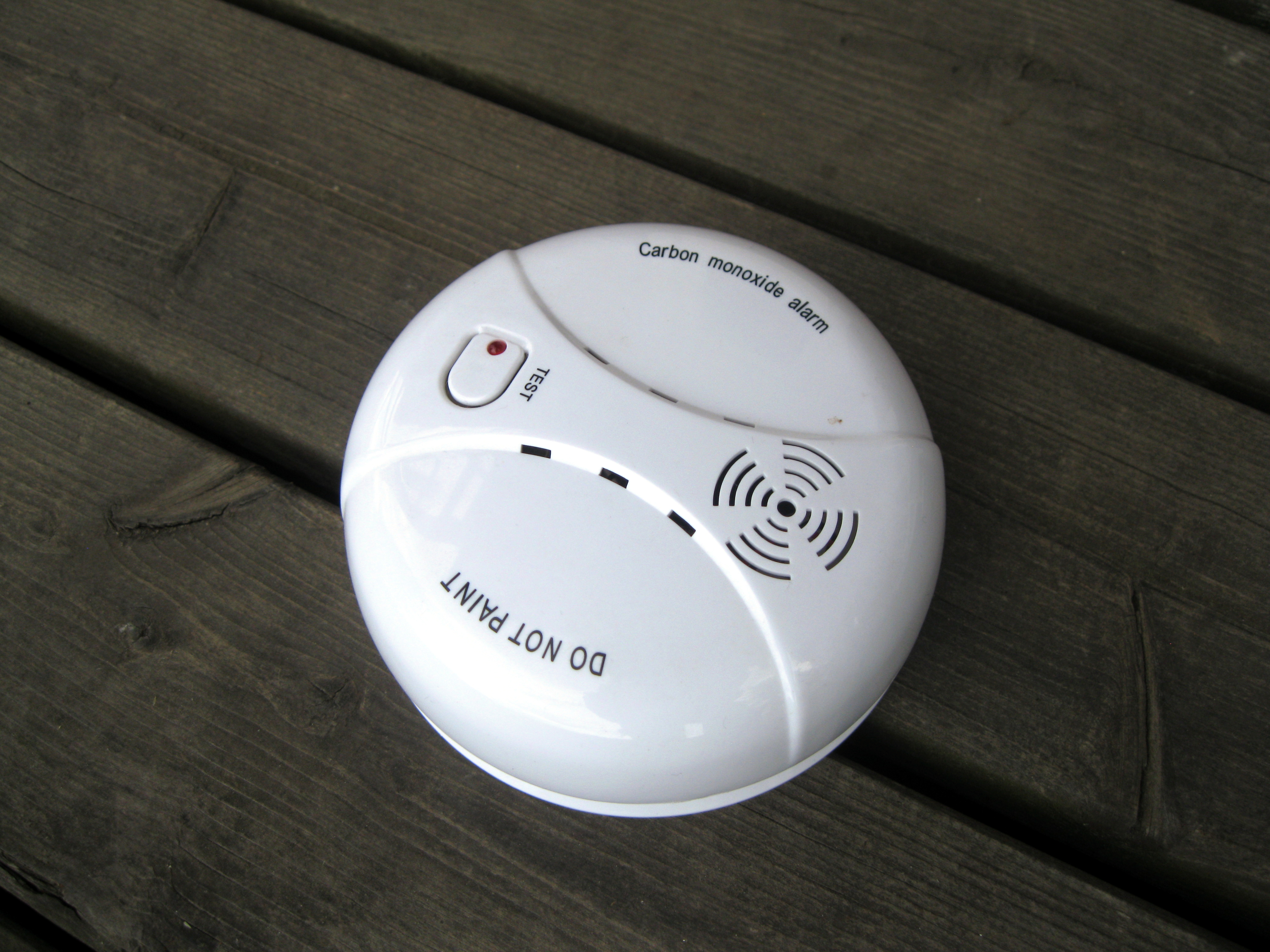
CO detector

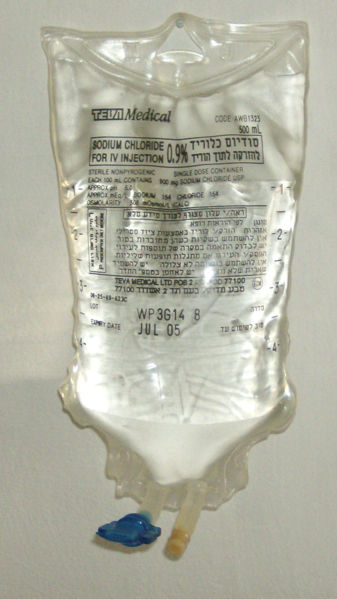
IV bag

- CO detector filters are IR welded to their plastic housing to prevent damaging the filter with particulate
- Medical IV-bags are IR welded to achieve minimal flash and particulate generation for smooth and clean fluid flow
- High-speed cut and seal film (300 m/min) processes allow for minimal fraying at the edges and cauterized seams
- Brake fluid reservoirs are IR welded to prevent clogging and contamination of the small fluid transmission channels
- PE pipes in the infrastructure of natural gas transmission undergo IR welding using TTIr to improve joint strength with minimal coupling deformation

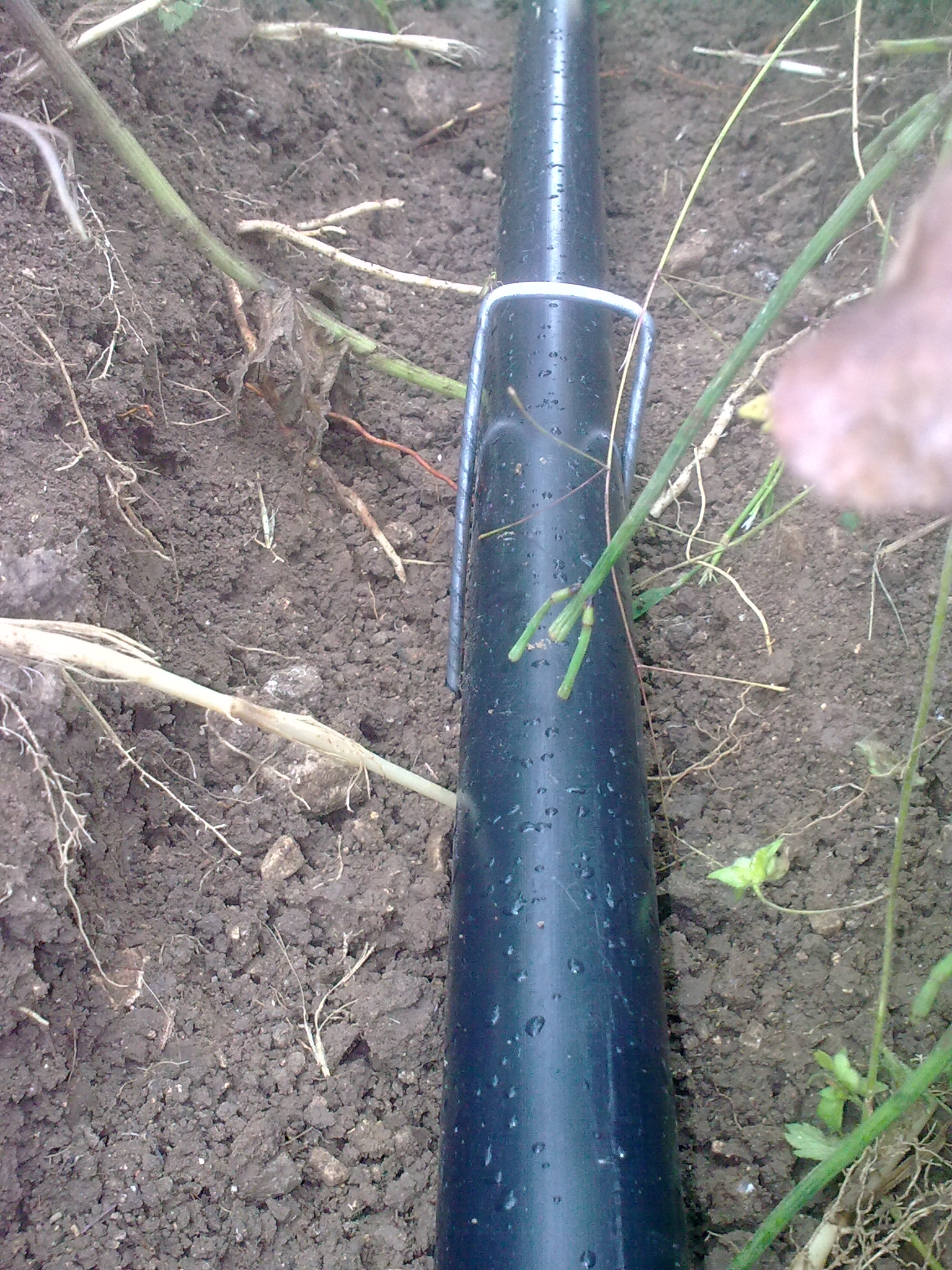
PE pipe
