= Mahabis =

mahabis, (stylised version vs Mahabis) is an e-commerce led, premium lifestyle brand founded in 2014, headquartered in London, with manufacturing in Europe and China. After entering administration on 27 December 2018, in January 2019 mahabis was acquired by YYX Capital, a special situations focused consumer investment company founded in April 2018. The company was given the Best Innovation in Footwear award at the Drapers Footwear Awards in 2015, and was also a finalist in two categories at those same awards.

== Products ==
mahabis sells a range of slippers and accessories. Their curve slippers feature a natural rubber sole so that they can be used both indoors and outdoors.

The designs of the slipper and the detachable sole were developed using techniques such as 3D printing. This enabled the brand to take the product from conception to market more quickly than traditional methods. The final product features materials conventionally used outside of textiles, such as neoprene and TPU.
