= Pokito =

Reusable cup brand

Pokito is the brand name of an ultra portable reusable cup that can be collapsed to a few centimetres when not in use and so can be stored easily in a pocket or purse. It was invented by the Canadian inventor Andrew Brooks.

== History ==
Andrew Brooks got the idea of designing a reusable cup when, in 2006, he saw felled forest destined for a paper mill. Around 2012, he came up with the concept of the cup. He then worked with engineers and designers to fine-tune his concept, and requested a patent on his invention in 2015. The patent was granted in December 2017. After two years of product development, it was launched on Kickstarter and raised more than £100,000.

== Name ==
Pokito is derived from the Spanish for "a little" - poquito - but is spelled with a "ki" for ease of pronunciation. It is also a reference to "pocket" in English, alluding to its ultra portability.

== Description ==
Pokito is an ultra portable reusable cup that can be collapsed to a few centimetres when not in use and so can be stored easily in a pocket or purse. It can also be unfolded into different sizes: "grande" (16oz or 475ml), "medio" (12oz or 350ml) or "espresso" (8oz or 230ml). Once a drink has been consumed in the cup, the remaining dregs of coffee are kept inside without leakage, even when the cup is folded back.

Pokito has been designed to reduce the usage of disposable cups. It also saves energy if the cup is used more than 15 times. It is made of a synthetic rubber called thermoplastic elastomer which has been independently tested and compliant to EU and FDA regulations. Pokito is manufactured entirely in the UK from materials that have been designed especially for durability and safety. Omega Plastics manufactures the cups which are sold £15 per unit.
