= Kraton =

Kraton may refer to:

- Kraton (Indonesia), an Indonesian name for palace
- Kraton, East Java, a subdistrict located in Pasuruan Regency, East Java, Indonesia
- Kraton, Yogyakarta, a subdistrict located in Yogyakarta, Special Region of Yogyakarta, Indonesia
- Kraton (polymer), a family of polymers produced by Kraton Corporation
- Craton, an old and stable part of the continental crust, formerly spelled kraton
- Kraton of Indigo, a character in the book The Letter for the King
