= Norman R. Legge =

Canadian researcher

Norman Reginald Legge (20 April 1919 – 28 March 2004) was a Canadian researcher for the Shell Oil Company and pioneer of thermoplastic elastomers, Kraton in particular.

== Personal ==
Legge was born on 20 April 1919 in Edmonton, Alberta, Canada. He died on 28 March 2004 in Livermore, California.

== Education ==
- 1942 BSC, Chemistry, University of Alberta
- 1943 MSC, Chemistry, University of Alberta
- 1945 Ph.D., McGill University, explosives research during World War II.

== Career ==
Legge worked as a research chemist for Polymer Corporation (formerly Polysar Corp.) in Sarnia, Ontario (1945-1951). Later, he moved to Kentucky Synthetic Rubber Corporation as Director of Research in Louisville. He then moved to Shell Chemical until his retirement.

He was a Fellow of the American Association for the Advancement of Science and a member of the American Chemical Society, Rubber Division.

== Awards and Recognitions ==
- 1987 - Charles Goodyear Medal from the ACS Rubber Division
- 1992 - IISRP Technical Award from the International Institute of Synthetic Rubber Producers
