= Universal Limbs =

Canadian nonprofit organization

Universal Limbs is a Canadian nonprofit organization that seeks to improve the lives of people with limb loss, particularly children affected by conflict and displacement where access to medical care and prosthetics are limited. The organization provides 3D-printed upper prosthetic limbs for free to restore independence to those who have experienced limb loss, and conducts ongoing research and development of functional upper-limb prosthetics.

== Type ==
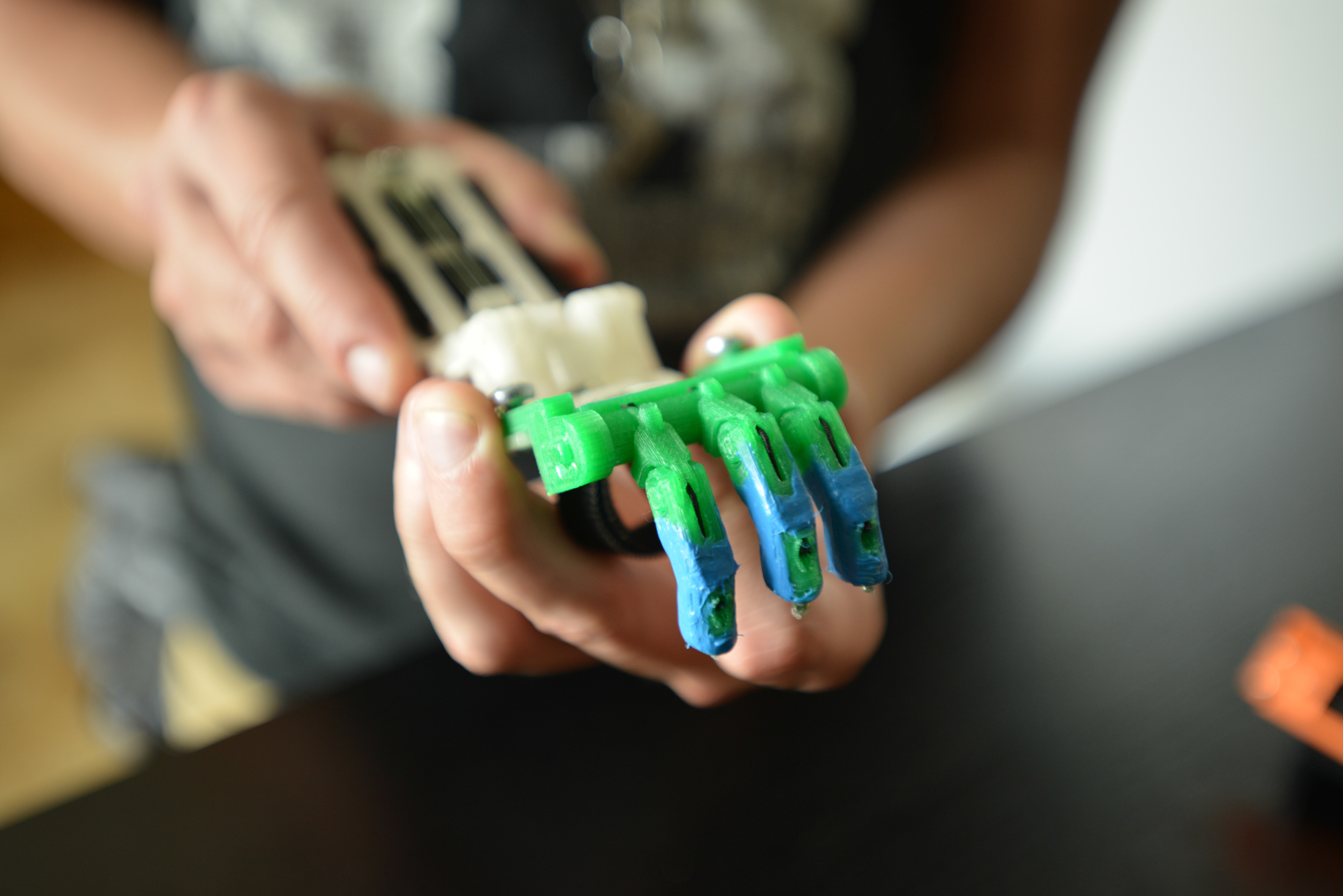
A 3D-printed hand

Using 3D-printers, the organization creates upper-limb prosthetics that are designed specifically to each person's body. Using a 3D-printer is much cheaper than traditional prosthetics and can be made in hours or days instead or weeks or months. Because 3D-printers use a 3D modeling software, designs can be adjusted and/or improved before being printed. The software also makes reprinting possible.

== Process of 3D-Printed Prosthetics ==
First, a person's limb or residual limb is measured. A computer program creates a 3D model of the prosthetic that fits the person's exact body shape. This ensures that the prosthetic is comfortable and functional. Engineers use the 3D modeling software to design the prosthetic where they can adjust the size, shape, joints, and grip strength. Because the design is digital, it can easily be modified or improved before printing. A 3D printer then builds the prosthetic layer by layer using materials such as durable plastics (often thermoplastics like PLA, TPU, or ABS). Universal Limbs uses Thermoplastic Polyurethane (TPU) to print their 3D models. The printer then follows the digital design and slowly deposits material until the full structure is created. After printing, the parts are assembled with components like screws, cables, or joints that allow the prosthetic to move, although, some do not need to be assembled. The device is then fitted to the user and adjusted to make sure it works properly and comfortably.

== History ==
Gaza Strip

Following the beginning of the Gaza War, the founders of Universal Limbs decided to launch this non-profit organization in 2025 to help wounded individuals, especially children, who have suffered limb loss. Based in Canada, the organization conducted its first operations in Cairo, Egypt because of its proximity to the Gaza Strip. Many wounded individuals and families fleeing the conflict seek refuge or medical care in Egypt. Cairo provides a strategic location to reach and assist those affected and wounded by the war. From there, Universal Limbs aims to provide free prosthetic limbs, rehabilitation, and support to victims of the conflict who would otherwise have limited access to such care.

== Funding ==
Universal Limbs operates through monetary donation-based funding. It relies on contributions from individuals and charitable donors to finance its programs and provide prosthetic limbs and rehabilitation services to war-wounded individuals.
