= SEBS =

SEBS may refer to:

- Styrene Ethylene Butylene Styrene Block Copolymer, a Thermoplastic elastomer
- Styrene-Ethylene-Butadiene-Styrene, a Thermoplastic elastomer
- southeast by south (SEbS), a point of the compass
