= Fracking hose =

Device used in hydraulic fracturing

Fracking hoses are used in hydraulic fracturing (fracking). Hydraulic fracturing uses between 1.2 and 3.5 million US gallons (4.5 and 13.2 Ml) of water per well, with large projects using up to 5 million US gallons (19 Ml). Additional water is used when wells are refractured; this may be done several times.

== Hose materials ==
The traditional solution is to use metal pipes to transfer water but these are costly to deliver and assemble. Thermoplastic polyurethane (TPU) covered hoses and Nitrile rubber (NBR) covered hoses have a lot of advantages compared to metal pipes. It is easy to deliver, assemble and disassemble hoses and long sections of NBR- and TPU-covered hoses reduce the possibility of leakage in connecting parts. These large-diameter NBR- and TPU-covered hoses are called fracking hoses.

== Hose selection ==
Fracking hoses are high-pressure, high-strength lay-flat hoses designed for pumping aggressive water around mine sites. Safety and efficiency are important factors when choosing products for these applications.

== History ==
Fracking hoses are solutions derived from the fire hose industries. The fire hose manufacturers manufacture NBR or TPU covered hoses for fire fighting, water discharge, irrigation etc. The fracking industries borrowed the idea from the fire hose industries and use these hoses in fracking.
