= Plastomer =

A plastomer is a polymer material which combines qualities of elastomers and plastics, such as rubber-like properties with the processing ability of plastic. As such, the word plastomer is a portmanteau of the words plastic and elastomer. Significant plastomers are ethylene-alpha olefin copolymers.

== See also ==
- Thermoplastic elastomer
