= Heat fusion =

Welding process to join thermoplastics

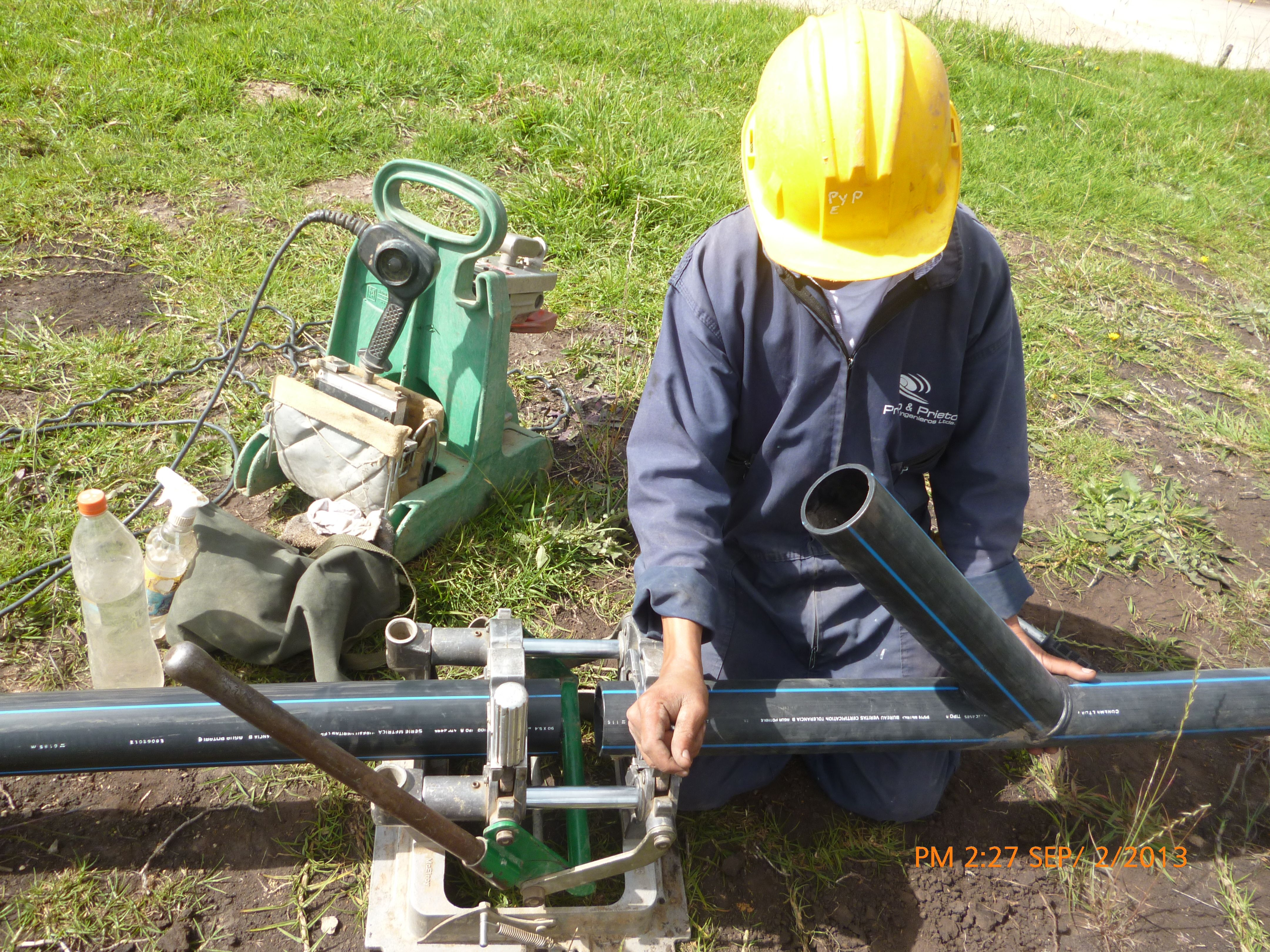
HDPE pipe fusion

Heat fusion (sometimes called heat welding, butt welding or simply fusion) is a welding process used to join two different pieces of a thermoplastic. This process involves heating both pieces simultaneously and pressing them together. The two pieces then cool together and form a permanent bond. When done properly, the two pieces become indistinguishable from each other. Dissimilar plastics can result in improper bonding.

== Applications ==
This process is commonly used in plastic pressure pipe systems to join a pipe and fitting together, or to join a length of pipe directly to another length of pipe. Generally, polyolefins (such as polypropylene, polyethylene, and polybutylene) are used for these applications.

== Types ==
Butt welding is usually performed using one of several methods. The first, and most common, is butt welding or butt fusion, which is a type of hot plate welding. This technique involves heating two planed surfaces of thermoplastic material (typically polyethylene) against a heated surface. After a specified amount of time, the heating plate is removed and the two pieces are pressed together and allowed to cool under pressure, forming the desired bond. Butt welding outside of manufacturing is usually performed to join pipes.

The other major technique is socket fusion. It is distinguished from butt-welding by using custom-shaped and -sized heating plates rather than a basic flat surface. These heads allow for more surface contact, reducing the time needed to heat and fuse the pipe. Socket fusion joins pipe and fittings together, rather than simply joining pipe to pipe. It requires less pressure than butt-welding and is more commonly used on smaller sizes of pipe (4" or less). Socket welding has additional advantages of requiring less machinery and is more portable than the heavier equipment required for butt fusion.

A third method of thermoplastic welding is called sidewall fusion, or saddle fusion. Sidewall fusion is, like butt fusion and socket fusion, another process based on hot plate welding. Sidewall fusion differs from either socket, or butt fusion methods by performing fusion into the side of the pipe wall in a transverse orientation to the main pipe, rather than in line with the pipe. Sidewall fusion is typically employed in conjunction with either socket or butt fusion methods as a complementary process and many fusion machines designed for butt fusion are also equipped for sidewall fusion. Adaptor plates that match the outside diameter of the main pipe are applied to the heating plate to perform this type of fusion.

Another method used is referred to as electrofusion. Electrofusion is a method of joining HDPE and other plastic pipes with special fittings that have built-in resistive wire which is used to weld the joint together. The pipes to be joined are trimmed, cleaned, inserted into the electrofusion fitting (with a temporary clamp if required) and a voltage (typically 40V) is applied using a device called an electrofusion processor. The processor controls how much voltage is applied, and for how long, depending on the fitting in use. As current is applied to the resistive wire, the coils heat up and melt the inside of the fitting and the outside of the pipe wall which weld together producing a very strong homogeneous joint. The assembly is then left to cool for a specified time. The joints produced tend to be more reliable than threaded fittings sealed with O-rings.
