= Laser welding of polymers =

Laser welding of polymers is a set of methods used to join polymeric components through the use of a laser. It can be performed using CO_{2} lasers, Nd:YAG lasers, Diode lasers and Fiber lasers.

When a laser encounters the surface of plastics, it can be reflected, absorbed or penetrate through the thickness of a component. Laser welding of plastics is based on the energy absorption of laser radiation, which can be reinforced by additives and fillers.

Laser welding techniques include:

- Direct laser welding
- Laser surface heating,
- Through transmission laser welding
- Intermediate film welding.

Because of high joining speeds, low residual stresses and excellent weld appearances, laser welding processes have been widely used for automotive and medical applications.

== Laser sources ==
The types of lasers used in the welding of polymers include CO_{2} lasers, Nd:YAG lasers, Diode lasers and fiber lasers. CO_{2} lasers are mostly applied to weld thin films and thin plastics due to the high energy absorption coefficients of most plastics. Nd:YAG lasers and Diode lasers produce short wavelength radiation, which transmit through several millimeters of unpigmented polymer. They are used in the transmission laser welding techniques.

=== Carbon dioxide lasers ===
Carbon dioxide lasers have a wavelength of 10.6 μm which is rapidly absorbed by most polymers. Because of the high-energy absorption coefficients, processing of plastics using CO_{2} can be done rapidly with low laser powers. This type of laser can be used in direct welding of polymers or cutting. However, the penetration of CO_{2} lasers is less than 0.5 mm and is mostly applicable for the welding of thin film and surface heating. Because the beam cannot be transmitted by silicon fiber, the beam is commonly delivered by mirrors.

=== Nd:YAG lasers ===
Nd:YAG lasers have a wavelength in the range of 0.9 - 1.1 μm, with 1064 nm being the most common. These lasers provide a high beam quality allowing for small spot sizes. This type of beam can be delivered via fiber optic cable.

=== Diode lasers ===
The wavelength of diode lasers is typically in the 780 - 980 nm wavelength range. Compared with Nd:YAG laser and CO_{2} laser, diode laser has supreme advantage in energy efficiency. The high-energy light wave can penetrate a thickness of a few millimeters in semicrystalline plastics and further in unpigmented amorphous plastics. Diode lasers can be either fiber delivered or local to the weld location. The relatively small size makes assembling arrays for larger foot prints possible.

=== Fiber laser ===
Fiber lasers typically exhibit wavelengths ranging from 1000 to 3500 nm. The expanded range of wavelengths has allowed for the development of through transmission welding without additional absorbing additives.

== Equipment ==
The equipment settings may vary greatly in design and complexity. However, there are five components included in most of the machines:

- generator/power supply
- control interface
- actuator
- lower fixture
- upper fixture.

=== Generator/Power supply ===
This component transforms the received voltage and frequency to the corresponding voltage, current and frequency to the laser source. Diode laser and fiber laser are the two most commonly used system for laser welding.

=== Control interface ===
The control interface is an interface between operator and machine to monitor operations of the system. It is constructed by logic circuits to send operators the information of machine status and welding parameters. Depending on different laser modes, the control interface will vary the parameters allowable to change.

=== Actuator ===
This component is a press activated by pneumatical and electrical power. It compresses the part in the upper fixture to touch the components in the lower fixture and apply pre-determined loads during welding processes. Displacement controls are added to actuators to monitor precisely the movements.

=== Lower fixture ===
Lower fixture is a jig structure that locates the lower part of a joint. It provides locations and alignments that ensure the welding of components with tight tolerances.

=== Upper fixture ===
The upper fixture is the most complicated and important component in the whole system. Laser beam is generated in this component to heat up the welding parts. The design of upper fixture often varies from laser sources and heating modes. For example, when a YAG laser or a diode laser is used as the heat source, optical fibers are often employed to provide mobility. However, the welding part cannot move.

== Laser interaction with polymers ==
There are three types of interactions that can occur between laser radiation and plastics:

- reflection,
- absorption
- transmission

The extent of individual interaction is dependent upon materials properties, laser wavelength, laser intensity and beam speed.

=== Reflection ===
Reflected and transmitted energy

Reflection of incident laser radiation is typically on the order of 5 to 10% in most polymers, which is low compared with absorption and transmission. The fraction of reflection (R) can be determined by the following equation,

$R=\frac{(n-m)^2}{(n+m)^2}$

where $n$ is the index of refraction of the plastics and $m$ is the index of refraction of air (~1).

=== Transmission ===
Transmission of laser energy through certain polymers allows for processes such as through transmission welding. When the laser beam travel through the interfaces between different medium, the laser beam is refracted unless the path is perpendicular to the surface. This effect needs to be considered when laser travels through multi-layer to reach the joint region.

Internal scattering occur when laser pass through the thickness in semicrystalline plastics, where crystalline and amorphous phase have different index of refraction. Scattering can also occur in crystalline and amorphous plastics with reinforcement like glass fiber and certain colorants and additives. In transmission laser welding, such effect can reduce the effective energy of laser radiation towards joint area and limit the thickness of components.

=== Absorption ===
Laser absorption can occur at the surface of plastics or during transmission through thickness. The amount of laser energy absorbed by a polymer is a function of the laser wavelength, polymer absorptivity, polymer crystallinity, and additives (i.e. composite reinforcements, pigments, etc.). The absorption at surface has two possible ways, photolytic and pyrolytic.

- Photolytic process occurs at short wavelength radiation (less than 350 nm or ultraviolet (UV)), when the photon energy is sufficient to break chemical bonds.
- Pyrolytic process occurs at long wavelength radiation (larger than 0.35 μm). Such process is involved with heat generations, which can be used for welding and cutting purposes.

The heat distribution within a laser welded polymer is dictated by the Bouger–Lambert law of absorption.

I(z) = I(z=0) e^{Kz}

where I(z) is the laser intensity at a certain depth z, I(z=0) is the laser intensity at the surface, K is the absorption constant.

=== Effect of additives ===
Polymers often have secondary elements added to them for various reasons (i.e. strength, color, absorption, etc.). These elements can have a profound effect on the laser interaction with the polymer component. Some common additives and their effect on laser welding are described below.

==== Reinforcements ====
Various fibers are added to polymeric materials to create higher strength composites. Some typical fiber materials include: glass, carbon fiber, wood, etc. When the laser beam interacts with these materials it can get scattered or absorbed, changing the optical properties from that of the base polymer. In laser transmission welding, a transparent material with reinforcement may absorb or dilute the energy beam more, effecting the quality of the weld. High contents of glass fiber content increase the scattering within the plastics and raise the laser energy input for welding a certain thickness.

==== Colorants ====
Colorants (pigments) are added to polymers for various reasons including aesthetics and functional requirements (such as optics). Certain color additives, such as titanium dioxide, can have a negative impact on the laser weldability of a polymer. The titanium dioxide provides a white coloring to polymers but also scatters laser energy making it difficult to weld. Another color additive, carbon black, is a very effective energy absorber and is often added to create welds. By controlling the concentration of carbon black with the absorbing polymer it is possible to control the effective area of the laser weld.

== Laser application configurations ==
The laser beam energy can be delivered to the required areas through a variety of configurations. The four most common approaches include:

- contour heating,
- simultaneous heating,
- quasi-simultaneous heating, and
- masked heating.

=== Contour heating ===
In the contour heating (laser scanning or laser moving) technique, a laser beam of fixed dimension passes through the desired area to create a continuous weld seam. The laser source is manipulated by a galvanic mirror or a robotic system to scan at a fast rate. The benefit of contour heating is that the weld can be performed with a single laser source, which can be reprogramed for different applications; however, due to the localized heating area, uneven contact between welding components can occur and form weld voids. The important parameters for this technique include: laser wavelength, laser power, traverse speed, and polymer properties.

=== Simultaneous heating ===
In the simultaneous heating approach, a beam spot of appropriate size is used to irradiate the entire weld area without the need for relative movement between the work piece and the laser source. For creating a weld with a large area, multiple laser sources can be combined to melt the selected region simultaneously. This approach can be adopted to substitute ultrasonic welding in the case of welding components sensitive to vibration. Key processing parameters for this approach include: laser wavelength, laser power, heating time, clamp pressure, cooling time, and polymer properties.

=== Quasi-simultaneous heating (QSLW) ===
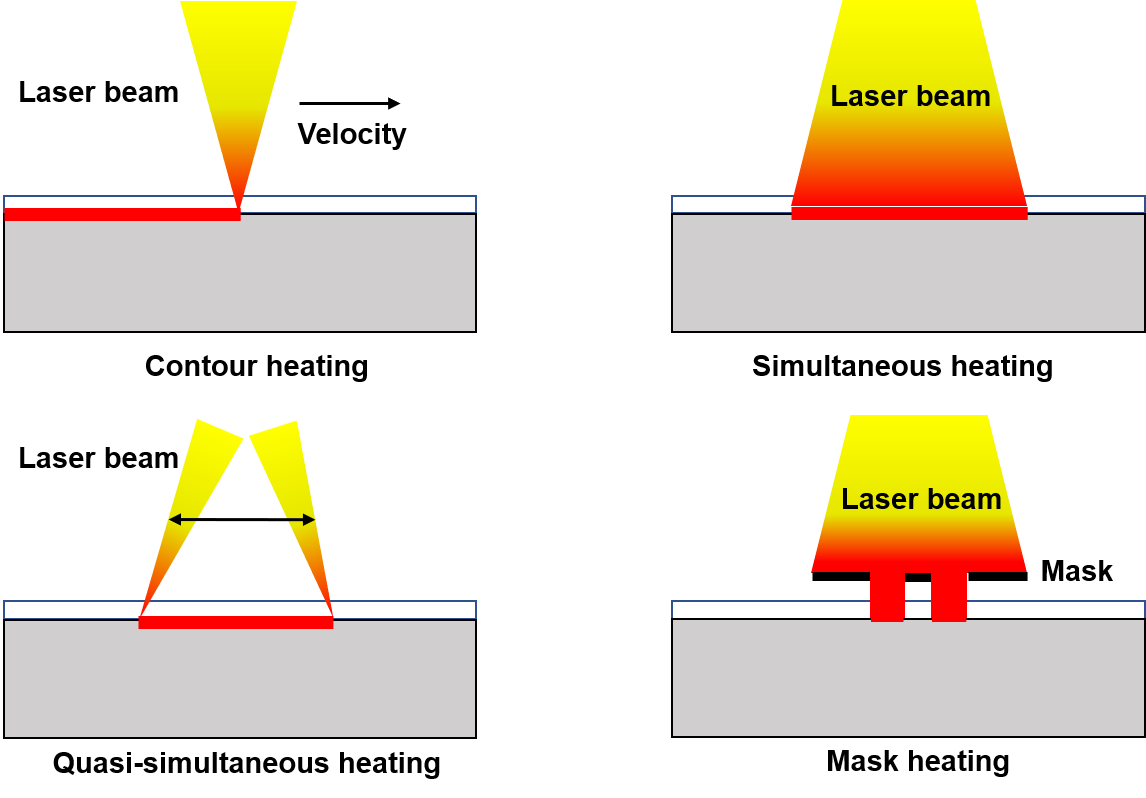
Laser heating configurations

In the quasi-simultaneous heating, a work area is irradiated by the use of scanning mirrors. The mirrors raster the laser beam over the entire work area rapidly, creating a simultaneously melted region. Some of the important parameters for this technique include: laser wavelength, laser power, heating time, cooling time, polymer properties.

=== Masked heating ===
Masked heating is a process of laser line scanning through a region with a mask, which ensures that only the selected areas can be heated when the laser pass through. Masks can be made out of laser cut steel, or other materials that effectively block the laser radiation. This approach is capable of creating micro-scale welds on components with complex geometries. Key processing parameters for this approach include: laser wavelength, laser power, heating time, clamp pressure, cooling time, and polymer properties.

== Laser welding techniques ==
Depending on different interactions between laser and thermoplastics, four different laser welding techniques have been developed for plastic joining. CO_{2} lasers have good surface absorption for most thermoplastics, hence they are applied for direct laser welding and laser surface heating. Through transmission laser welding and intermediate film welding require the deep penetration of laser beam, so YAG lasers and diode lasers are the most common sources for these techniques.

=== Direct laser welding ===
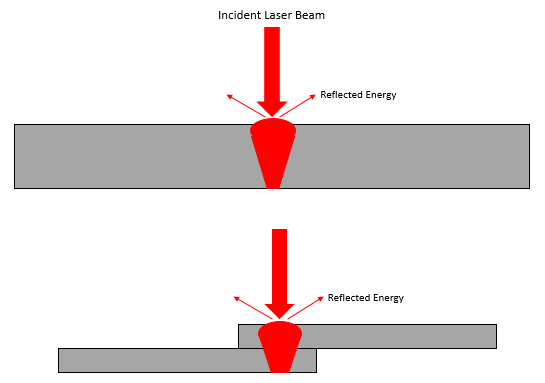
Direct laser welding of polymers

Similar to laser welding of metals, in direct laser welding the surface of the polymer is heated to create a melt zone that joins two components together. This approach can be used to create butt joints and lap joints with complete penetration. Laser wavelengths between 2 and 10.6 μm are used for this process due to their high absorptivity in polymers.

=== Laser surface heating ===
Laser surface heating is similar to non-contact hot plate welding in that mirrors are placed between components to create a molten surface layer. The exposure duration is usually between 2-10 s. Then the mirror is retracted and the components are pressed together to form a joint. Process parameters for laser surface heating include the laser output, wavelength, heating time, change-over time, and forging pressure and time.

=== Through transmission laser welding (TTLW) ===
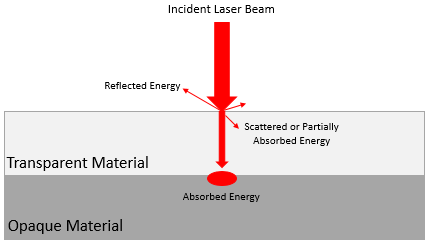
Diagram of transmission laser welding of polymers

Through transmission laser welding of polymers is a method to create a joint at the interface between two polymer components with different transparencies to laser wavelengths. The upper component is transparent to the laser wavelength between 0.8 μm to 1.05 μm, and the lower component is either opaque in nature, or modified by the addition of colorants which promote the absorption of laser radiation. A typical colorant is carbon black that absorb most of the electromagnetic wavelength. When the joint is irradiated by the laser, the transparent layer passes the light with minimal loss while the opaque layer absorbs the laser energy and heats up.

The two components are held by the lower fixture to control alignment and a small clamping force is added to the upper part to form intimate contact. A melt layer is then created at the interface between the two components, composed of a mixture of two plastic materials.

There are four different modes of transmission laser welding: scanning mode, simultaneous, quasi-simultaneous, and mask heating.

Many benefits can be obtained by transmission laser welding such as fast welding velocity, flexibility, good cosmetic properties and low residual stresses. From processing perspectives, laser welding can be performed in the pre-assembled conditions, reducing the necessity for complex fixtures; however, this method is not suitable for plastics with high crystallinity due to refraction and geometric limitations.

=== Intermediate film welding ===
Intermediate film welding is a method to join incompatible plastic components by using an intermediate film between them. Similar to transmission welding, laser radiation passes through the transparent components and melts the intermediate layers to create a joint. This film can be made of an opaque thermoplastic, solvent, viscous fluid, or other substances that heat up upon exposure to laser energy. The combination of intermediate films and adhesion promoters is able to join incompatible thermoplastics together. The thin layer then generates the heat required to fuse the system together.

== Applications ==
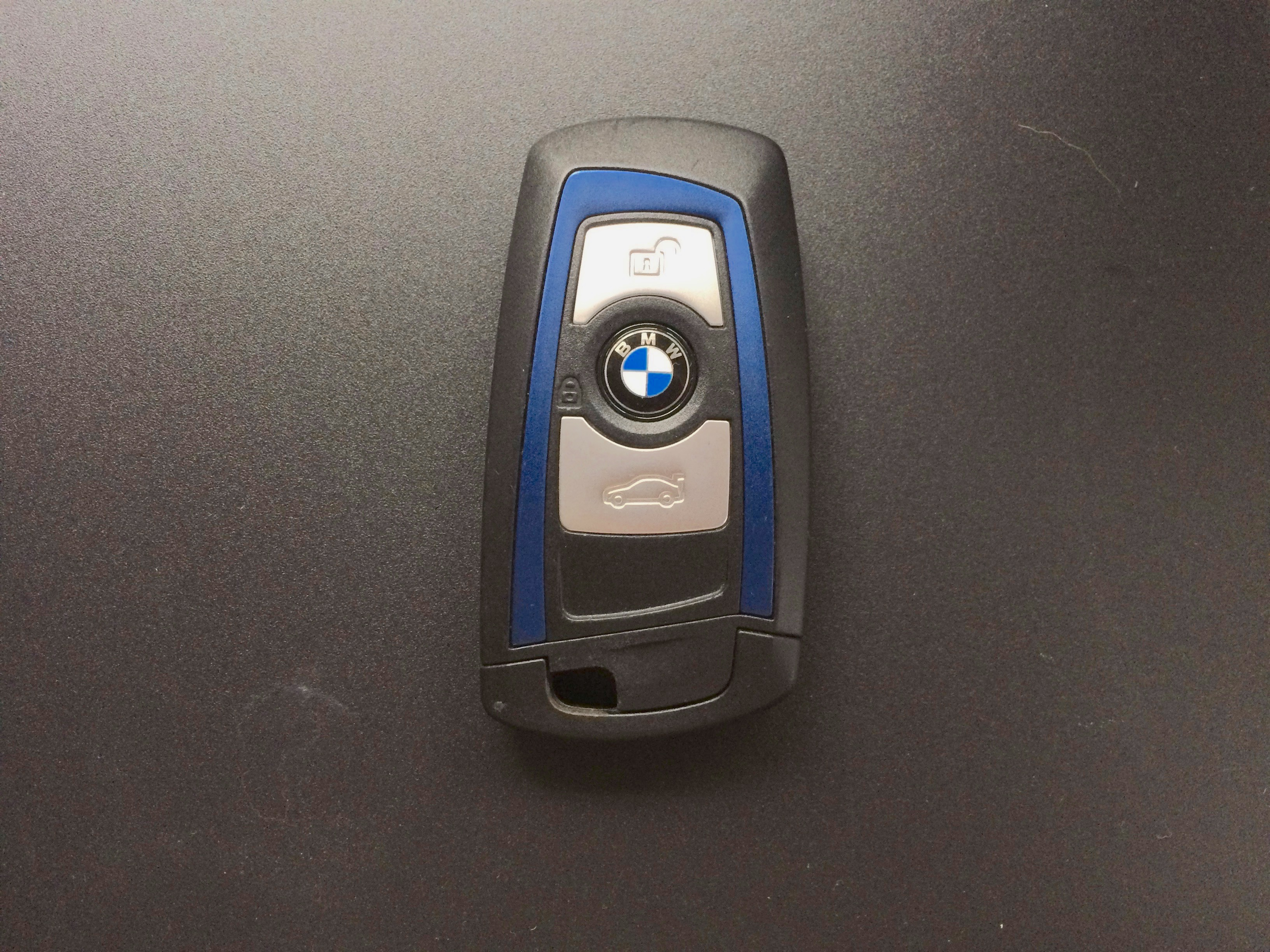
Car ignition key

=== Automotive applications ===
The black body of car keys is welded by the Through Transmission Laser Welding (TTLW) technique, in which laser radiation transmits through the upper component and forms a joint at the interface. Carbon black is added to the lower part of car keys to absorb laser radiation. The black color of the upper part is made by the addition of dye, which makes the component appear black but transparent to laser radiation.

Other applications of laser welding in automotive industry include brake fluid reservoirs and lighting components.

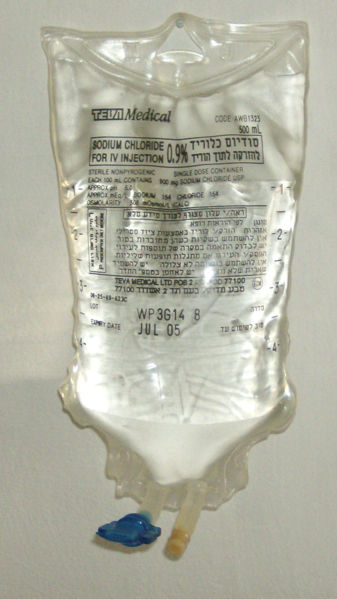
IV bag

=== Medical applications ===
Laser welding of plastics is applied to weld medical devices like IV-bags. Joints of high geometrical complexity can be produced by laser welding without particulate formation. This is critical for the safety of patients, when welding techniques are applied to produce IV-bags containing blood. In addition, flashes generated during welding can cause blood turbulences and destroy blood platelets. A good control of the laser power avoids flash formation and thus protects the blood cells from damage.
