= Kraton (polymer) =

Proprietary high-performance elastomer

Kraton is the trade name given to a number of high-performance elastomers manufactured by Kraton Polymers, and used as synthetic replacements for rubber. Kraton polymers offer many of the properties of natural rubber, such as flexibility, high traction, and sealing abilities, but with increased resistance to heat, weathering, and chemicals.

== Company ==
The origin of Kraton polymers goes back to the synthetic rubber (GR-S) program funded by the U.S. government during World War II to develop and establish a domestic supply capability for synthetic styrene butadiene rubber (SBR) as an alternative to natural rubber.

Shell Oil Company purchased the Torrance, California facility from the U.S. government that was built to make synthetic styrene butadiene rubber. The company formed Elastomers Division that eventually became Kraton Corporation. Shell Oil Company broadened the product portfolio of elastomers in the 1950s, under the technical leadership of Murray Luftglass and Norman R. Legge.

As part of the divestment program that was announced by Shell in December 1998, the Kraton elastomers business was sold to a private equity firm Ripplewood Holdings in 2000. Kraton completed IPO on December 17, 2009, to became a separate publicly traded company. In 2021 Kraton employees won an ASC Innovation Award for "Next Generation of Biobased Tackifiers REvolutionTM". Kraton employees accept an ASC Innovation Award

== Properties ==
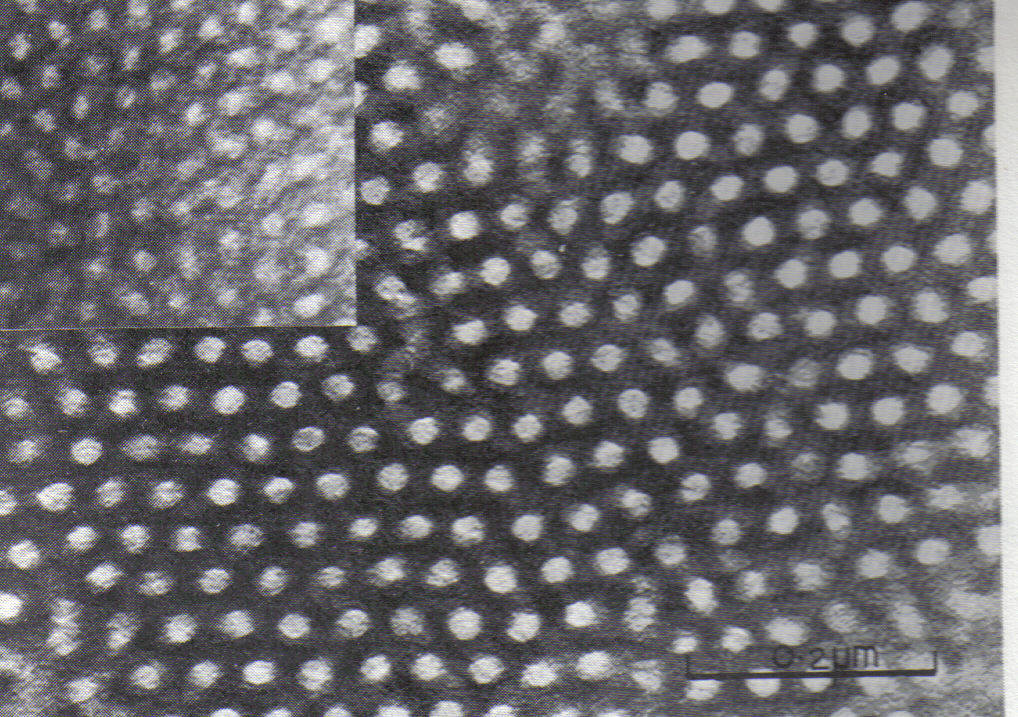
Sbs block copolymer in TEM

Kraton polymers are styrenic block copolymer (SBC) consisting of polystyrene blocks and rubber blocks. The rubber blocks consist of polybutadiene, polyisoprene, or their hydrogenated equivalents. The tri-block with polystyrene blocks at both extremities linked together by a rubber block is the most important polymer structure observed in SBC. If the rubber block consists of polybutadiene, the corresponding triblock structure is: poly(styrene-block-butadiene-block-styrene) usually abbreviated as SBS. Kraton D (SBS and SIS) and their selectively hydrogenated versions Kraton G (SEBS and SEPS) are the major Kraton polymer structures. The microstructure of SBS consists of domains of polystyrene arranged regularly in a matrix of polybutadiene, as shown in the TEM micrograph. The picture was obtained on a thin film of polymer cast onto mercury from solution, and then stained with osmium tetroxide.

The glass transition temperature (T_{g}) of the polybutadiene blocks is typically −90 °C and T_{g} of the polystyrene blocks is +100 °C. So, at any temperature between about −90 °C and +100 °C Kraton SBS will act as a physically crosslinked elastomer. If Kraton polymers are heated substantially above the T_{g} of the styrene-derived blocks, that is, above about 100 °C, like 170 °C the physical cross-links change from rigid glassy regions to flowable melt regions and the entire material flows and therefore can be cast, molded, or extruded into any desired form. On cooling, this new form resumes its elastomeric character. This is the reason such a material is called a thermoplastic elastomer (TPE). The polystyrene blocks form domains of nanometre size in the microstructure, and they stabilize the form of the molded material. Depending on the rubber-to-polystyrene ratio in the material, the polystyrene domains can be spherical or form cylinders or lamellae. The hydrogenated Kraton polymers named Kraton G exhibit improved resistance to temperature (processing at 200–230 °C is common), to oxidation, and to UV. SEBS and SEPS due to their polyolefinic rubber nature present excellent compatibility with polyolefins and paraffinic oils.

== Applications ==
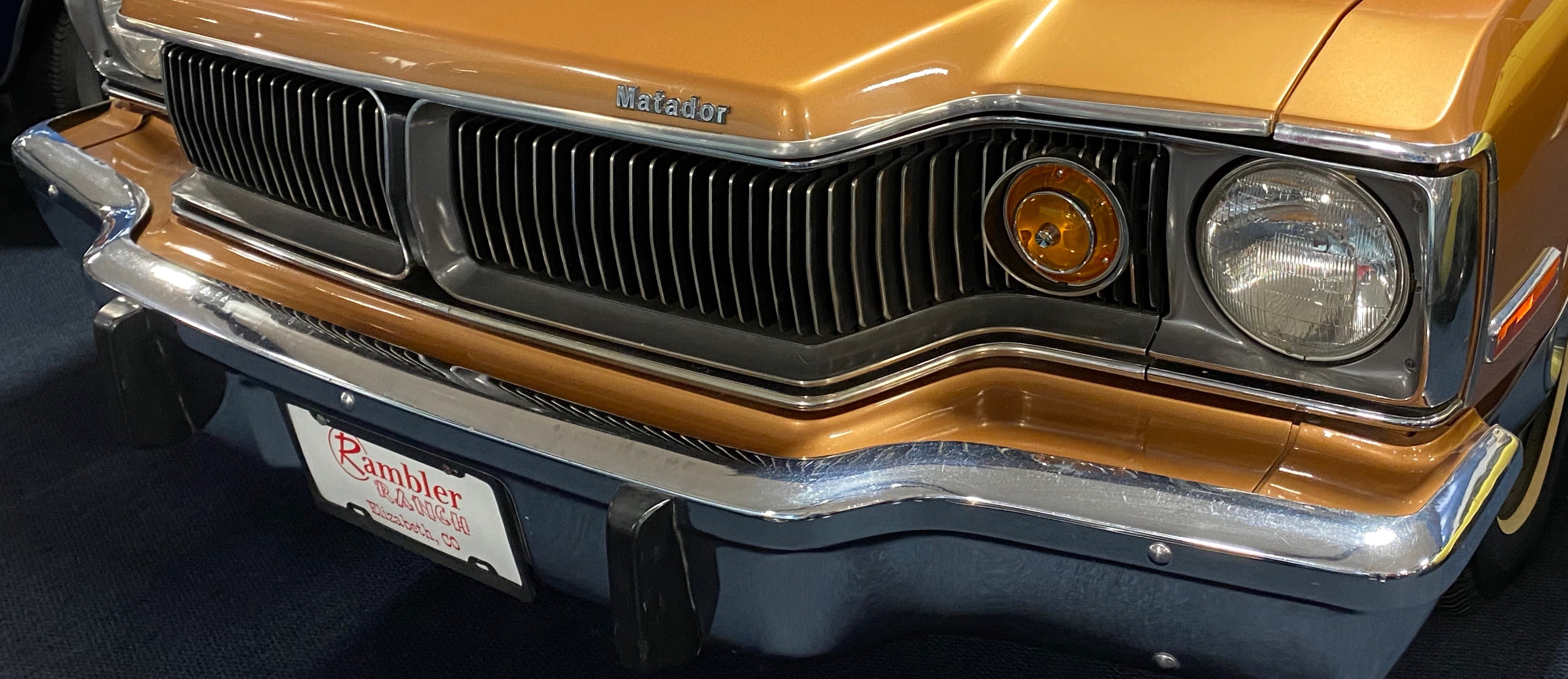
Flexible fascia between bumper and body on 1974-1978 AMC Matador sedans and station wagons

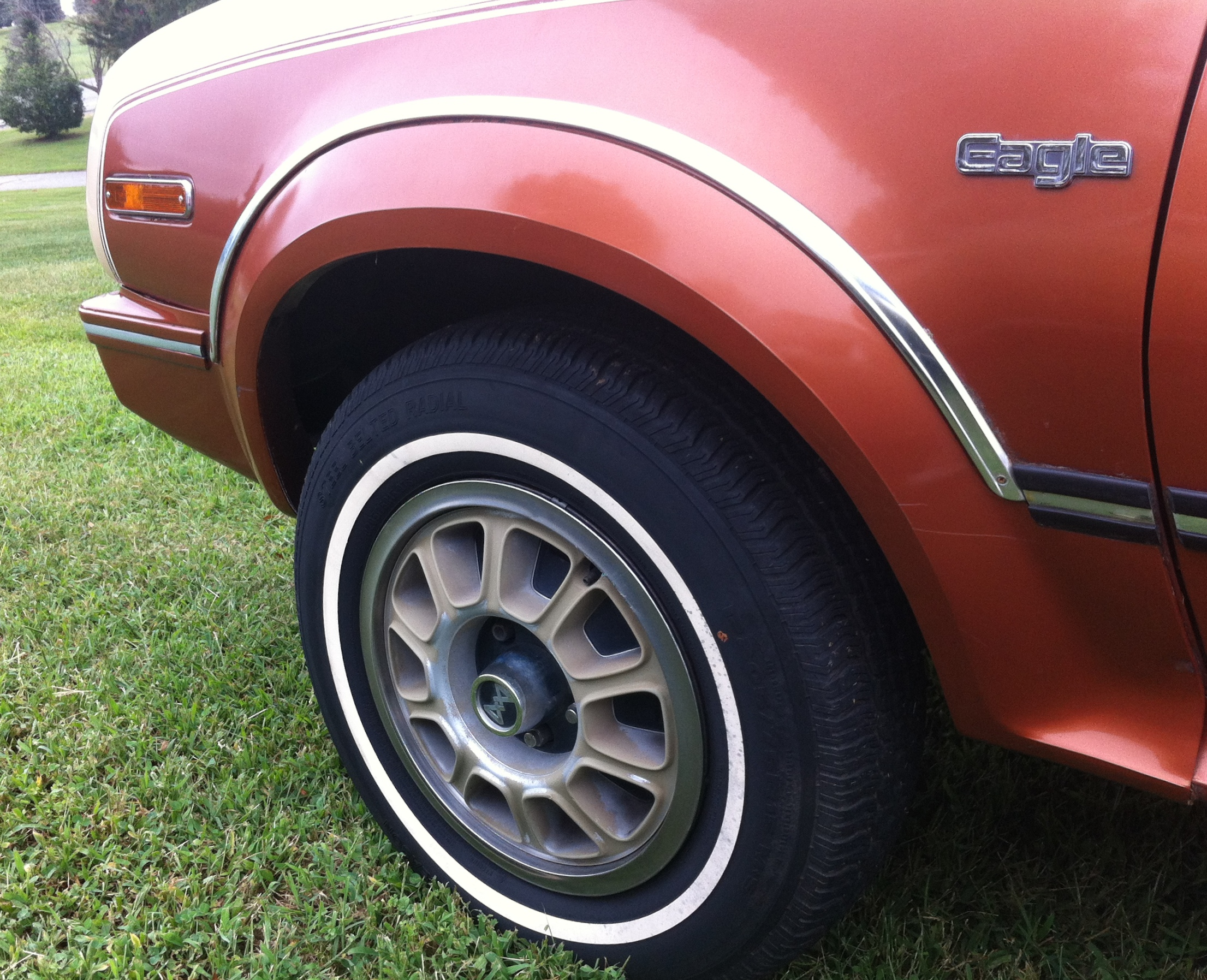
Color matched Kraton wheel opening extensions on 1980–1988 AMC Eagles

Kraton polymers are used in blends with various other ingredients, such as paraffinic oils, polyolefins, polystyrene, bitumen, tackifying resins, and fillers to provide end-use products, including hot melt adhesives, impact-modified transparent polypropylene bins, medical TPE compounds, modified bitumen roofing felts, oil gels and elastic attachments in diapers.

It can make asphalt flexible, which is necessary if the asphalt is to be used to coat a surface that is below grade or for highly demanding paving applications like F1 racing tracks.

Kraton-based compounds are also used in non-slip knife handles.

The earliest commercial components using Kraton G (thermoplastic rubber) in the automobile industry were in 1970s. The implementation of U.S. requirements for automobile bumpers to absorb 5 mph (8 km/h) impacts with no damage to the car's safety equipment lead to the first successful commercial automotive application of specialized flexible polymers as fascia for the 1974 AMC Matador.

American Motors Corporation (AMC) also used this polymer plastic on the AMC Eagle for the color matched flexible wheel arch flares that flowed into rocker panel extensions. This was needed because of the Eagle's 2-inch wider track compared to the AMC Concord platform on which the AWD cars were based. The Eagle's Kraton bodywork was lightweight, flexible, and did not crack in cold weather as is typical of fiberglass automobile body components.

Some grades of Kraton can also be dissolved into hydrocarbon oils to create "shear thinning" grease-type products that are used in the manufacture of telecommunications cables containing optical fibers.
