= Thermoplastic polyurethane =

Class of polyurethane plastics

Thermoplastic polyurethane (TPU) is any of the polyurethane polymers that are thermoplastic; that is, they become pliable when heated and harden when cooled. This is in contrast to most polyurethanes, which are thermosets, hardening irreversibly. Thermoplastic polyurethanes (TPUs) reveal vast combinations of both physical properties and processing applications. Usually, they are flexible and elastic with good resistance to impact, abrasion and weather. With TPUs, there is the possibility for colouring as well as fabrication using a wide range of techniques. The incorporation of TPUs could therefore improve the overall durability of many products.

Thermoplastic polyurethanes have many desirable properties, including elasticity, transparency, and resistance to oil, grease, and abrasion. Technically, they are thermoplastic elastomers, consisting of linear segmented block copolymers composed of hard and soft segments.

== Chemistry ==
TPU is a block copolymer consisting of alternating sequences of hard and soft segments or domains formed by the reaction of (1) diisocyanates with short-chain diols (chain extenders) and (2) diisocyanates with long-chain diols. By varying the ratio, structure, and/or molecular weight of the reaction compounds, an enormous variety of different TPU can be produced. This allows urethane chemists to fine-tune the polymer's structure to the desired final properties of the material.

== Morphology ==
A TPU resin consists of linear polymeric chains in block-structures. Such chains contain low polarity segments which are rather long (called soft segments), alternating with shorter, high polarity segments (called hard segments). Both types of segments are linked by covalent links so that they actually form block-copolymers. The miscibility of the hard and soft segments in TPU depends on the differences in their glass transition temperature (Tg) which occurs at the onset of micro-Brownian segmental motion, identifiable by dynamic mechanical spectra. For an immiscible TPU, the loss modulus spectrum typically shows double peaks, each of which is assigned to the Tg of one component. If the two components are miscible, the TPU will be characterized by a single broad peak whose position lies between that of the two original Tg peaks of the pure components.

The polarity of the hard pieces creates a strong attraction between them, which causes a high degree of aggregation and order in this phase, forming crystalline or pseudo crystalline areas located in a soft and flexible matrix. This so-called phase separation between both blocks can be more or less important, depending on the polarity and the molecular weight of the flexible chain, the production conditions, etc. The crystalline or pseudo crystalline areas act as physical cross-links, which account for the high elasticity level of TPU, whereas the flexible chains will impart the elongation characteristics to the polymer.

These "pseudo crosslinks", however, disappear under the effect of heat, and thus the classical extrusion, injection molding, and calendering processing methods are applicable to these materials. Consequently, TPU scrap can be reprocessed.

== Uses ==
TPU has many applications, including automotive instrument panels, caster wheels, power tools, sporting goods, medical devices, drive belts, footwear, inflatable rafts, fire hoses, and buffer weight tips, along with a variety of extruded film, sheet, and profile uses. TPU is also a popular material found in flexible outer cases of devices like mobile phones and keyboard protectors.

TPU is used in wire and cable jacketing, hose and tube, in adhesive and textile coating applications, and as an impact modifier of other polymers. It is also used in high-performance films, such as high impact resistant glass structures.

TPU is one thermoplastic elastomer used in fused filament fabrication (FFF) 3D printing. The absence of warping and lack of need for primer makes it an ideal filament for 3D printers when objects need to be flexible and elastic. Since TPU is a thermoplastic, it can be melted by the 3D printer's hotend, printed, then cooled into an elastic solid. TPU powders are also used for other 3D printing processes, such as selective laser sintering (SLS) and 3D inkjet printing. It is also used in large vertical injection or extrusion moulding machines to print directly without the intermediate step of filament extrusion or powder preparation.

== Overview of TPU on the market ==
Properties of commercially available TPU include:

- high abrasion resistance
- low-temperature performance
- high shear strength
- high elasticity
- transparency
- oil and grease resistance

The currently available TPUs can be divided mainly into two groups, based on soft segment chemistry:

1. polyester-based TPUs (mainly derived from adipic acid esters)
2. polyether-based TPUs (mainly based on tetrahydrofuran (THF) ethers).

The differences between these two groups are outlined in the table below.

== Table of properties ==
Table 1: Main differences between polyester- and polyether-based TPU.

(A = excellent; B = good; C = acceptable; D = poor; F = very poor)

Property	Polyester-based TPU	Polyether-based TPU
Abrasion resistance	A	A
Mechanical properties	A	B
Low temperature flexibility	B	A
Heat aging	B	D
Hydrolysis resistance	D	A
Chemical resistance	A	C
Microbial resistance	D	A
Adhesion strength	B	D
Injectability	B	B

TPU is the right choice when flexibility at low temperatures and/or an abrasion resistant thermoplastic elastomer (TPE) is requested. Polyether-based TPU in cases where additional excellent hydrolysis and microbial resistance is required, as well as in cases where extreme low-temperature flexibility is important. Ester-based TPU in cases where oil and grease resistance is more relevant.

When stable light colour and non-yellowing performance are required, aliphatic TPU (ATPU) based on aliphatic isocyanates is used.

BASF has pioneered crosslinking during TPU transformation, made possible by adding liquid crosslinkers or using a solid granulated additive masterbatch. Plant-based bio TPU has been developed for green thermoplastic elastomer applications by BASF, Merquinsa-Lubrizol and GRECO, marketed as Elastollan N, Pearlthane ECO and Isothane respectively.

== Safety ==
TPU may contain siloxanes, some of which are considered substances of very high concern by the European Union.

== See also ==
- Fracking hose
- Mobile phone cover
- Polycarbonate
- Silicone
