= Thermoplastic elastomer =

Type of polymer with both thermoplastic and elastic properties

Thermoplastic elastomers (TPE), sometimes referred to as thermoplastic rubbers (TPR), are a class of copolymers or a physical mix of polymers (usually a plastic and a rubber) that consist of materials with both thermoplastic and elastomeric properties.

While most elastomers are thermosets, thermoplastic elastomers are not, in contrast making them relatively easy to use in manufacturing, for example, by injection moulding. Thermoplastic elastomers show advantages typical of both rubbery materials and plastic materials. The benefit of using thermoplastic elastomers is the ability to stretch to moderate elongations and return to its near original shape creating a longer life and better physical range than other materials.

The principal difference between thermoset elastomers and thermoplastic elastomers is the type of cross-linking bond in their structures. In fact, crosslinking is a critical structural factor which imparts high elastic properties.

IUPAC definition

Thermoplastic elastomer: Elastomer comprising a thermoreversible network.

== Types ==
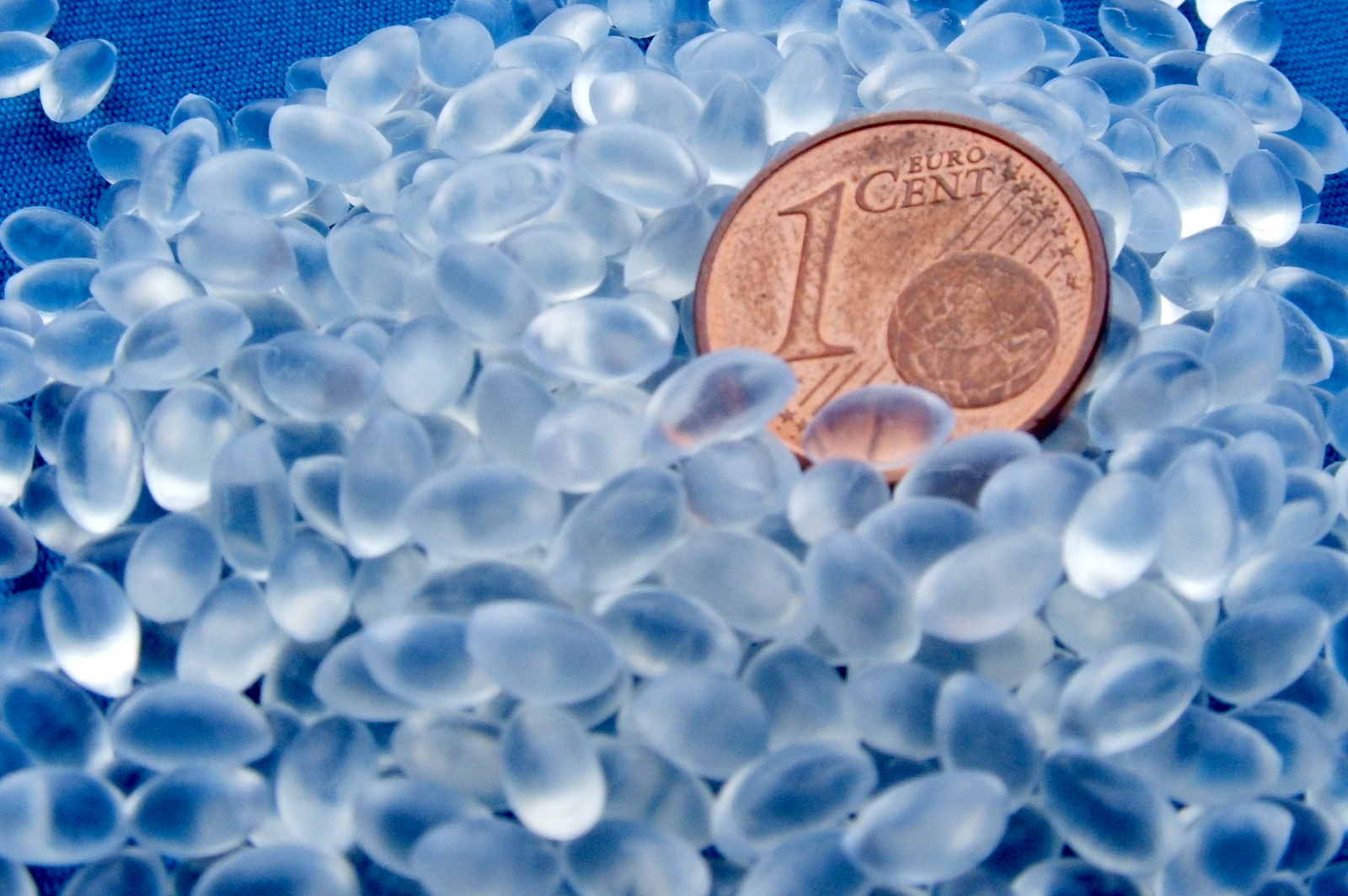
Thermoplastic polyurethanes

There are six generic classes of commercial TPEs (designations according to ISO 18064) together with one unclassified category:

- Styrenic block copolymers, TPS (TPE-s)
- Thermoplastic polyolefinelastomers, TPO (TPE-o)
- Thermoplastic vulcanizates, TPV (TPE-v or TPV)
- Thermoplastic polyurethanes, TPU (TPU)
- Thermoplastic copolyester, TPC (TPE-E)
- Thermoplastic polyamides, TPA (TPE-A)
- Unclassified thermoplastic elastomers, TPZ

=== Examples ===
- TPE materials that come from the block copolymers group include CAWITON†, MELIFLEX, THERMOLAST K†, THERMOLAST M†, Chemiton, Arnitel, Hytrel, Dryflex†, Mediprene, Kraton, Pibiflex, Sofprene†, Tuftec† and Laprene†. † indicates styrenic block copolymers (TPE-s).
- Laripur, Desmopan, Estane, Texin and Elastollan are examples of thermoplastic polyurethanes (TPU).
- Sarlink, Santoprene, Termoton, Solprene, THERMOLAST V, Vegaprene, and Forprene are examples of TPV materials.
- Examples of thermoplastic olefin elastomers (TPO) compound are For-Tec E or Engage. Ninjaflex used for 3D printing.

=== Criteria for thermoplastic elastomers ===
In order to qualify as a thermoplastic elastomer, a material must have these three essential characteristics:

- The ability to be stretched to moderate elongations and, upon the removal of stress, return to something close to its original shape
- Processable as a melt at elevated temperature
- Absence of significant creep

== History ==
SBS block copolymer schematic microstructure

TPE became a commercial reality when thermoplastic polyurethane polymers became available in the 1950s. During the 1960s styrene block copolymer became available, and in the 1970s a wide range of TPEs came on the scene. The worldwide usage of TPEs (680,000 tons/year in 1990) is growing at about nine percent per year.

== Microstructure ==
The styrene-butadiene materials possess a two-phase microstructure due to incompatibility between the polystyrene and polybutadiene blocks, the former separating into spheres or rods depending on the exact composition. With low polystyrene content, the material is elastomeric with the properties of the polybutadiene predominating. Generally they offer a much wider range of properties than conventional cross-linked rubbers because the composition can vary to suit final construction goals.

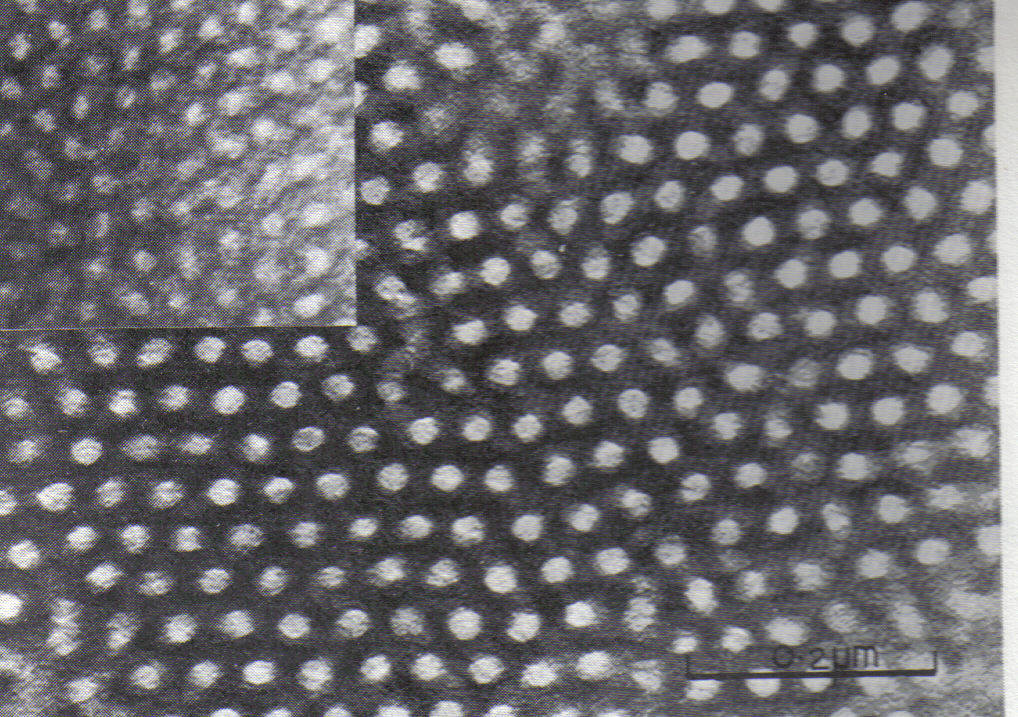
SBS block copolymer in TEM

Block copolymers can "microphase separate" to form periodic nanostructures, as in the styrene-butadiene-styrene (SBS) block copolymer (shown at right). The polymer is known as Kraton and is used for shoe soles and adhesives. Owing to the microfine structure, a transmission electron microscope (TEM) was needed to examine the structure. The butadiene matrix was stained with osmium tetroxide to provide contrast in the image.

The material was made by living polymerization so that the blocks are almost monodisperse, so helping to create a very regular microstructure. The molecular weight of the polystyrene blocks in the main picture is 102,000; the inset picture has a molecular weight of 91,000, producing slightly smaller domains. The spacing between domains has been confirmed by small-angle X-ray scattering, a technique which gives information about microstructure. Since most polymers are incompatible with one another, forming a block polymer will usually result in phase separation, and the principle has been widely exploited since the introduction of the SBS block polymers, especially where one of the block is highly crystalline. One exception to the rule of incompatibility is the material Noryl, where polystyrene and polyphenylene oxide or PPO form a continuous blend with one another.

Schematic crystalline block copolymer

Other TPEs have crystalline domains where one kind of block co-crystallizes with other block in adjacent chains, such as in copolyester rubbers, achieving the same effect as in the SBS block polymers. Depending on the block length, the domains are generally more stable than the latter owing to the higher crystal melting point. That point determines the processing temperatures needed to shape the material, as well as the ultimate service use temperatures of the product. Such materials include Hytrel, a polyester-polyether copolymer and Pebax, a nylon or polyamide-polyether copolymer.

== Advantages ==
Depending on the environment, TPEs have outstanding thermal properties and material stability when exposed to a broad range of temperatures and non-polar materials. TPEs consume less energy to produce, can be colored easily by most dyes, and allow economical quality control. TPE requires little or no compounding, with no need to add reinforcing agents, stabilizers or cure systems. Hence, batch-to-batch variations in weighting and metering components are absent, leading to improved consistency in both raw materials and fabricated articles. TPE materials have the potential to be recyclable since they can be molded, extruded and reused like plastics, but they have typical elastic properties of rubbers which are not recyclable owing to their thermosetting characteristics. They can also be ground up and turned into 3D printing filament with a recyclebot.

== Processing ==
The two most important manufacturing methods with TPEs are extrusion and injection molding. TPEs can now be 3D printed and have been shown to be economically advantageous to make products using distributed manufacturing. Compression molding is seldom, if ever, used. Fabrication via injection molding is extremely rapid and highly economical. Both the equipment and methods normally used for the extrusion or injection molding of a conventional thermoplastic are generally suitable for TPEs. TPEs can also be processed by blow molding, melt calendaring, thermoforming, and heat welding.

== Applications ==
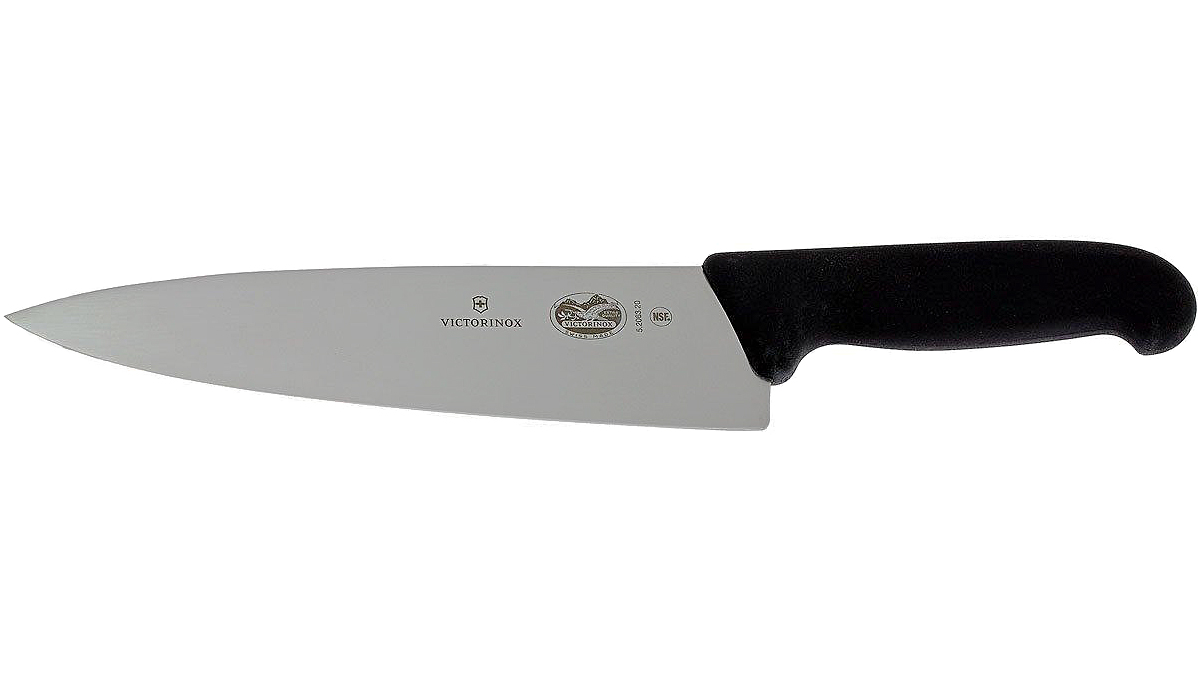
Chef's knife with TPE grip

TPEs are used where conventional elastomers cannot provide the range of physical properties needed in the product. These materials find large application in the automotive sector and in household appliances sector. For instance, copolyester TPEs are used in snowmobile tracks where stiffness and abrasion resistance are at a premium. Thermoplastic olefins (TPO) are increasingly used as a roofing material. TPEs are also widely used for catheters where nylon block copolymers offer a range of softness ideal for patients. Thermoplastic silicone and olefin blends are used for extrusion of glass run and dynamic weatherstripping car profiles. Styrene block copolymers are used in shoe soles for their ease of processing, and widely as adhesives.

Owing to their unrivaled abilities in two-component injection molding to various thermoplastic substrates, engineered TPS materials also cover a broad range of technical applications ranging from automotive market to consumer and medical products. Examples of those are soft grip surfaces, design elements, back-lit switches and surfaces, as well as sealings, gaskets, or damping elements. TPE is commonly used to make suspension bushings for automotive performance applications because of its greater resistance to deformation when compared to regular rubber bushings. The latest technologies can now be applied to car floor mats, dashboard components, bumpers, interior soft touch surfaces, and air deflectors.Thermoplastics have experienced growth in the heating, ventilation, and air conditioning (HVAC) industry due to the function, cost effectiveness and adaptability to modify plastic resins into a variety of covers, fans and housings.

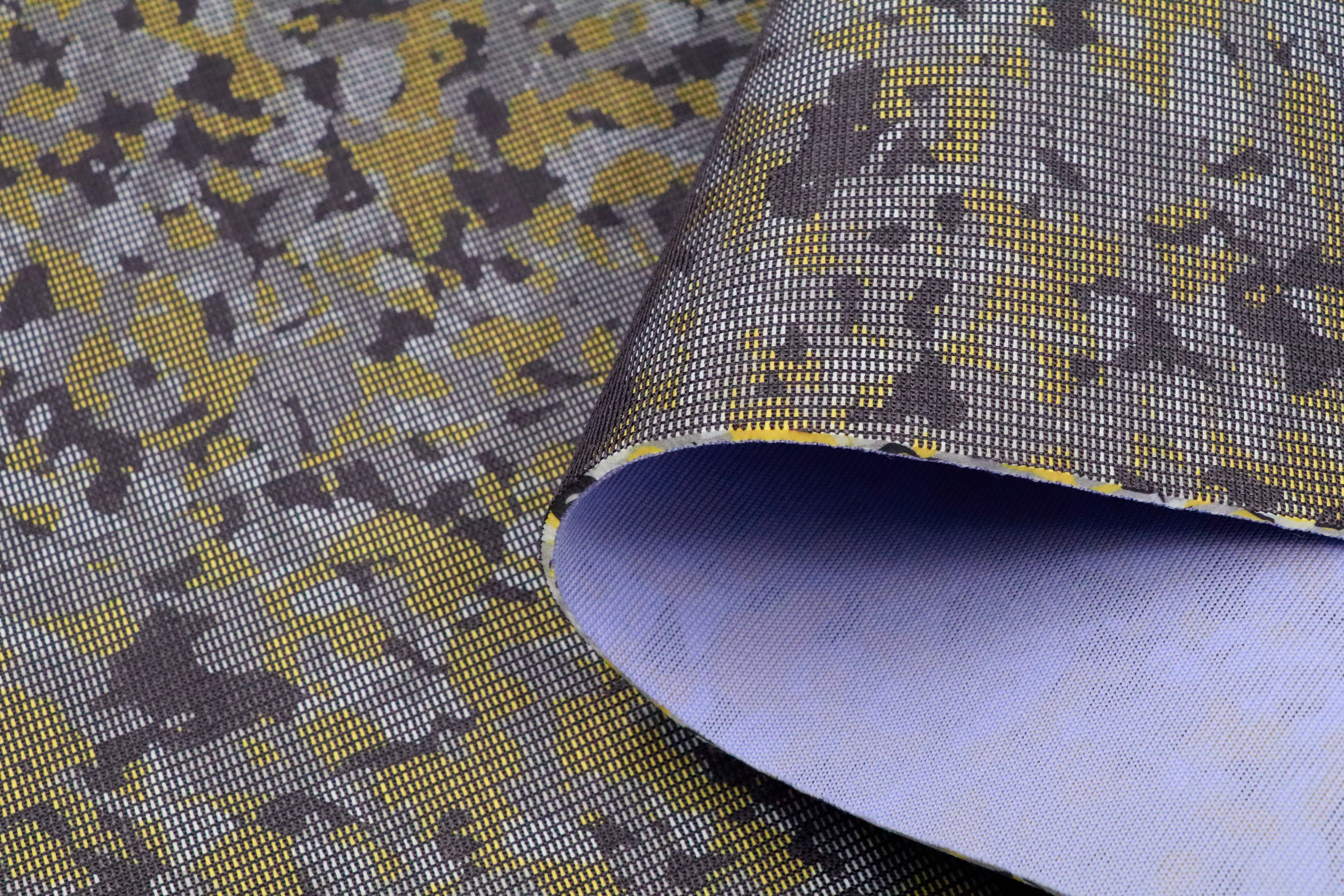
Recycled TPE foam and fabric lamination

== See also ==
- Plastomer
