= Hot plate welding =

Thermal welding technique for joining thermoplastics

Hot plate welding, also called heated tool welding, is a thermal welding technique for joining thermoplastics. A heated tool is placed against or near the two surfaces to be joined in order to melt them. Then, the heat source is removed, and the surfaces are brought together under pressure. Hot plate welding has relatively long cycle times, ranging from 10 seconds to minutes, compared to vibration or ultrasonic welding. However, its simplicity and ability to produce strong joints in almost all thermoplastics make it widely used in mass production and for large structures, like large-diameter plastic pipes. Different inspection techniques are implemented in order to identify various discontinuities or cracks.

== History ==
Hot plate welding was first used in the early 1930s for joining PVC. It gained in popularity with the prevalence of polyolefins, which are difficult to adhesively bond. By the 1960s, it was among the most widely used plastic welding methods. Hot plate welding was used for pipelines and appliances as well as injection moldings. Numerous national and international associations for welding have specifications and guidelines for hot plate welding, including the Deutscher Verband fuer Schweissen (DVS) in Germany, the American Welding Society (AWS) in the United States, and the Comité Européen de Normalisation (CEN) in Europe.

== Process ==
=== Conventional hot plate welding ===
Pressure versus time for the phases of hot plate welding

The hot plate welding process can be divided into four phases: matching, heating, change-over, and welding/forging.

The matching phase serves to match the geometry of the weld surfaces to the theoretical welding plane. The weld surfaces are heated through conduction by physical contact with the hot plate. The hot plate temperature range is 30 to 100 °C (86 to 212 °F) above the melting temperature of the material, and a constant pressure between 0.2 and 0.5 MPa is applied against the hot plate. This causes the weld surfaces to conform to the hot plate, which has the desired weld geometry. This also removes surface irregularities that would increase thermal contact resistance. After the parts are in full contact with the hot plate, the heating phase starts and pressure is reduced to a minimum.

During the heating phase, the weld region is heated conductively until melted, without substantial displacement of the material. Pressure is maintained either at a minimum to keep the parts and the hot plate in contact or at zero with a preset displacement. The melt surface reaches approximately 20 °C (68 °F) below the temperature of the hot plate. The viscosity of the melted material can be controlled through the temperature of the hot plate and the heating time. The surface of hot plate is often coated with PTFE to stop the molten plastic from sticking, which limits the hot plate temperature to 270 °C (518 °F). The temperature of the parts during this phase can be modeled by assuming a constant temperature boundary condition and using the one-dimensional heat equation:

$$\theta(x,t) = \theta_i + (\theta_s - \theta_i) \cdot \operatorname{erfc} \left(\frac{x}{2\sqrt{\kappa t}}\right)$$

where θ is the temperature, x is the position, t is the time, θ_{i} is the initial temperature, θ_{s} is the constant surface temperature, κ is the thermal diffusivity, and erfc is the complementary error function. This model is valid for most cases, since the thermal contact resistance is low and the thermal mass of the hot tool is large compared to the plastic parts. For more precise predictions of the heat flow, the thermal contact resistance and the temperature dependence of the thermal properties of the plastic also need to be considered.

After sufficient heating time, the change-over phase begins. During this phase, the parts are retracted from the hot plate, the plate is quickly moved away, and the parts are brought together. The change-over should be as short as possible, because the melted region cools off during this time.

The welding/forging phase begins when the two molten surfaces are pressed together. This creates intermolecular diffusion of the plastic molecules according to reptation theory. Weld strength is provided by entanglement of the diffused plastic molecules. The necessary welding pressure depends on the melt viscosity and wall thickness of the parts and usually ranges between 0.025 and 0.05 MPa. This pressure is maintained while the melted material cools and resolidifies. During this, some plasticized material in the weld zone is squeezed out, forming flash. Mechanical stops may be used to limit the amount of squeezed out material in order to prevent a cold weld.

=== Variants ===
Common variants of conventional hot plate welding include high-temperature and non-contact versions. Both of these variants help with the problem of material sticking to the hot plate between weld cycles; the stuck material can degrade and transfer to subsequent welds, resulting in poor quality and aesthetically unappealing welds.

With high-temperature hot plate welding, an uncoated hot plate is heated to between 300 and 400 °C (572 and 752 °F), as the PTFE coating degrades at high temperatures. The high temperature decreases the viscosity of the melt, so it can peel off from the hot plate when removing the parts. This can be accompanied during the change-over phase by rapid movement of the parts from the hot plate; this prevents stringing of the melted plastic due to its viscoelastic properties. Any residual material on the hot plate's surface is usually either oxidized away or mechanically removed. With some thermoplastics, the residual material cannot be easily removed and accumulates over time. The hot plates may need to be removed and cleaned between cycles. With the higher temperatures, the matching and heating phases are shortened from those of conventional hot plate welding. However, reduced weld strength from thermal degradation of the plastic can still occur, though most of the degraded material is forced out by the flow of melted material. High-temperature hot plate welding is known to perform well for:

- PP and PP copolymers
- ABS and PMMA

With non-contact hot plate welding, the weld surfaces are melted without physical contact with the hot plate through convection and radiation heating. The hot plate temperature is between 400 and 550 °C (752 and 1,022 °F), and the weld surfaces are placed about 1 to 3 millimetres (0.039 to 0.118 in) from the hot plate. Heat input needs to be controlled to prevent thermal degradation while plasticizing the material. This variant has no matching phase, so part fit must be good prior to welding, with part deviation not exceeding 0.2 millimetres (0.0079 in). In practice, non-contact hot plate welding is only used for small parts whose dimensions do not exceed 100 by 100 millimetres (3.9 by 3.9 in). An additional consideration is the stack effect when the hot plate is oriented vertically, which can cause uneven heating of the weld surfaces.

Another variant is hot wedge or hot shoe welding for joining thin sheets with lap seams. A heated wedge travels between the two sheets and melts the weld surfaces while wedge rollers apply light pressure to force intimate contact; drive rollers apply pressure at the tip of the wedge where the sheets converge to form a continuous seam. Hot wedge welding can produce either single or dual seam joints. For dual seam joints, a split wedge that is unheated in the middle is used. This leaves an unwelded air pocket between the seams that can be pressurized to nondestructively test the joint integrity. With hot wedge welding, the speed of travel is an added parameter as the wedge unit is self-propelled by the rollers. The typical temperature range when welding high-density polyethylene (HDPE) is 220 to 400 °C (428 to 752 °F); the travel speed is typically 0.7 to 4 metres per second (2.3 to 13.1 ft/s).

=== Parameters ===
Parameters used in hot plate welding are the hot plate temperature, the pressure (or displacement) during matching, the pressure during heating, the pressure and displacement during the weld phase, and the times for matching, heating, change-over and cooling. These parameters have an interdependent effect on the weld quality and cannot be set individually.

The hot plate temperature is taken at the surface of the plate. It is set based on the hot plate welding variant along with the properties of the material, including melting temperature, melt viscosity, and thermal degradation limits. Conventional hot plate welding uses temperatures 30 to 100 °C (86 to 212 °F) above the melting temperature. The high-temperature variant uses temperatures above the material's degradation temperature, about 100 to 200 °C (212 to 392 °F) above the melting point. The non-contact variant uses temperatures 300 to 400 °C (572 to 752 °F) above the melting point. With non-contact welding, the radiation heating depends not only on the temperature but also on the emissivity of the hot plate material.

The pressure during the matching phase removes warpage of the weld surfaces to ensure full contact with the hot plate without causing the parts to deform. During the heating phase, a minimum pressure is maintained to keep the parts in contact with the hot plate, as a larger pressure would squeeze out material. The welding pressure brings the molten weld surfaces into intimate contact and squeezes out entrapped air. Too high a pressure would squeeze out most of the hot material from the joint, leaving cooler material to form a cold weld. Too low a pressure limits intermolecular diffusion and produces a weak weld. A mechanical stop may be used in the welding phase to limit the amount of material squeeze out by varying the welding pressure.

The matching and heating times control the amount of heat input during those phases. The matching time is set so that surface irregularities are melted and removed. The heating time determines the melt layer thickness. Too thick a melt results in excess flash and unfavorable molecular orientation at the joint interface. Too thin a melt produces a brittle weld. The change-over time determines the temperature of the melted material as welding begins and, therefore, should be as short as possible to minimize surface cooling. Typical change-over times are around 2 to 3 seconds, even for large parts. Cooling time refers to the time until the joined parts have solidified (when the molten material has cooled below its melting temperature) and can be removed from the machine. The welded part should not be stressed until it has further cooled until room temperature.

=== Equipment ===
Hot plate welding equipment consists of two main components, a clamping fixture and one or multiple hot plates. The primary function of the fixture is to provide support during the welding process to prevent deformation under welding pressure. Conventional machines have fixtures that fully conform to the parts being welded and allow for flexibility in production by accepting different fixture configurations. Custom machines may be configured to weld a specific component and do not provide as much flexibility as standard machines.

Hot plates are generally designed for specific working temperatures. Hot plates for conventional hot plate welding have a working temperature of at least 270 °C (518 °F) and are made from aluminum alloys. The hot plates may also be coated in Polytetrafluoroethylene (PTFE) to prevent sticking of the polymer to the hot plate. Caution should be taken as the PTFE coatings degrade over time and sets of interchangeable fixtures should be available during continuous operation. Hot plates for high-temperature hot plate welding have a maximum working temperature of 430 °C (806 °F) and are made from aluminum bronze alloys. Due to the lower thermal conductivity of these alloys precaution must be taken to ensure that there is uniform heating along the hot plate surface. PTFE has a maximum working temperature of 270 °C (518 °F) therefore, non-stick coatings cannot be used for this type of operation. Lastly, hot plates for non-contact hot plate welding are used for temperatures up to 550 °C (1,022 °F) are made from either aluminum bronze or stainless steels.

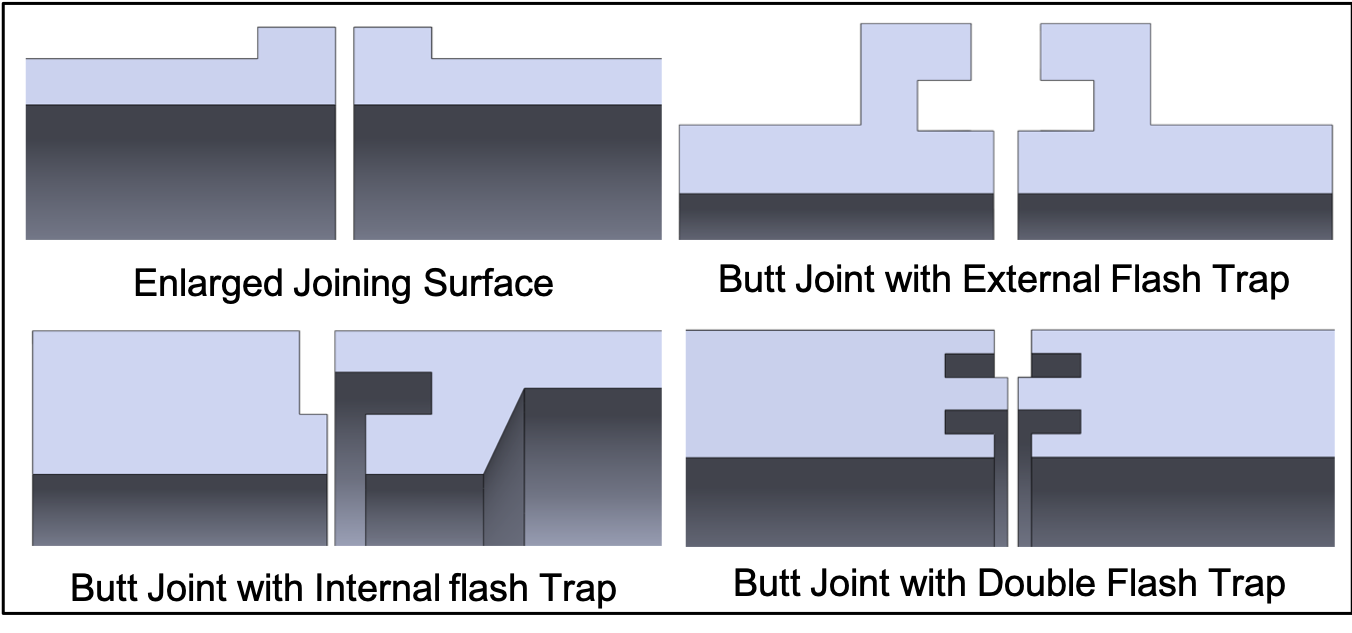
Thermoplastic Joint Designs

Hot plate welding machines are generally operated by pneumatic, hydraulic or electromechanical controls. Machines can be configured to perform welds with the faying surface in either the horizontal or vertical position. Longer components such as pipes are more commonly welded in the horizontal position whereas moldings with internal fittings such as a starter battery are welded in the vertical position. A proportional-integral-derivative (PID) controller also assists in maintaining desired temperatures during each process.

=== Joint Types ===
While there are various joint configurations, a butt joint in which the two joining materials are aligned along the same plane is one of the most common joint designs for thermoplastics. There are various modifications of this joint that are implemented for different applications which include the following listed below.

- Enlarged Joining Surface - Using filler materials in welds lowers the overall strength and this can be compensated for by enlarging the joint surface.
- Butt Joint Flash Trap (Internal) - The bead is covered by a rib or flash trap.
- Butt Joint Flash Trap (External) - This type of joint hides flash on the outside surface and is generally used to reduce noise in surrounding areas.
- Butt Joint Flash Trap (Double) - Makes the surface more visually appealing by hiding the flash on both sides of the weld.

== Material weldability ==
Hot plate welding can be used for joining all thermoplastics and thermoplastic elastomers whose melting temperature range lies below their decomposition temperature. Since only the plastic itself can be joined, additives, used to improve material properties or reduce cost, can reduce weldability. Additives can also reduce weld strength by acting as stress concentrators. Examples of additives include stabilizers, lubricants, processing aids, coloring agents, reinforcing materials (talcum, glass fibers, carbon fibers, etc.).

The water content of the plastic also affects weldability. This affects thermoplastics that absorb water from the surrounding air, mainly amorphous thermoplastics. High water content can lead to the formation of bubbles during heating and joining, reducing weld strength. Therefore, parts should be welded shortly after injection molding, stored in a dry environment, or welded with adjusted parameters.

Hot plate welding can be used to join some combinations of dissimilar thermoplastics. Typically, semi-crystalline plastics are only compatible with semi-crystalline plastics, and amorphous plastics are only compatible with amorphous plastics. If the plastics have the same melting point and melt viscosity, conventional or high-temperature hot plate welding can be used. With different melting points or different viscosities, dual hot plates should be used, with each hot plate set to a different temperature. Common thermoplastic combinations include:

- ABS – PMMA
- ABS – PC
- ABS – SAN
- PMMA – PC + ABS
- PC – PC + ABS

== Applications ==
Hot plate welding is used for joining parts ranging from a few centimeters up to 1.6 meters. It is also used for making continuous welds in lining membranes. Its usage can be divided into two main categories, namely production applications and pipe welding. These differ in their equipment and joint designs.

=== Production applications ===
One major industry using hot plate welding is the automotive sector. Tail light housings made of ABS are joined with lenses made of either PMMA or PC using a modified butt joint. ABS and PMMA have similar melting temperatures and can be welded using a single hot plate, while ABS and PC requires dual hot plates due to PC's higher melting temperature. Vacuum suction cups are used to move the parts to prevent scuffing. Both conventional and high-temperature variants are used. A typical cycle time is 60 seconds with a hot plate temperature of 370 °C.

Fuel tanks made of blow-molded HDPE need as many as 34 parts welded to it, including clips, filler necks, vent lines, Heat shield boss plug, Gas vent value/Roll over Valves, Breather Nipple and brackets. The parts are welded individually using groove butt joints. Each component needs a different matching time, and cycle times are less than a minute per component.

The cases and lids of automotive batteries are made of thin PP copolymers, which have low melt viscosity. High-temperature hot plate welding is used on butt joints with flash covers. A typical machine can weld two batteries in a time of less than 30 seconds.

Other automotive components welded by hot plate are carburetor floats, coolant and washer fluid reservoirs, and ventilation ducts. Non-automotive items include dishwasher spray arms, laundry detergent boxes, steam iron reservoirs, HDPE barrels, PP transport pallets, medical needle disposal boxes, and PVC window frames.

=== Pipe welding ===
Hot plate welding, referred to as fusion welding in many industries, is commonly used to join plastic pipes. These pipes, as opposed to steel ones, are less likely to rupture during an earthquake. Pipe welding uses special joint configurations, namely butt, socket and saddle/sidewall, each with its own welding procedures.

Butt fusion welding has similar process phases as conventional hot plate welding. Before welding, the pipe ends are faced and the profiles are rounded and aligned with each other. The remaining phases proceed as normal, though sometimes the matching phase can be skipped. When welding dissimilar plastics, in lieu of dual hot plates, the pipe with the lower melt flow index can be heated earlier than the other, such that both pipe ends have the same melt viscosity at the end of the heating phase. After cooling, the flash bead is sometimes removed to leave smooth surfaces on the interior and exterior. Problems with the weld can be determined by inspecting this bead.

Socket fusion welding uses male and female heating tools attached to a hot plate to heat the exterior of the pipe and the interior of the socket simultaneously. This is typically used for pipes ranging from 40 to 125 millimeters. With this joint, the welding pressure is supplied by the interference fit of the pipe and socket, so these parts as well as the heating tools need to be within tolerance.

Saddle/sidewall fusion welding is used for joining saddle fittings onto the sidewall of a pipe to create branches. The exterior of the pipe and the matching surface of the saddle fitting are heated using concave and convex heating tools. The saddle fusion machine applies welding force through the centerline of the pipe. Prior to welding, the exterior of the pipe needs to be cleaned of all contaminants, because the melt layer of the pipe is not displaced from the joint.

== Non-destructive Testing (NDT) ==
There are two methods of testing including non-destructive and destructive testing. While the quality of a weld can only be determined through destructive means, NDT allows for the determination of defects in the welded region. The following section will highlight some of the non-destructive methods used in welding of thermoplastics.

=== Visual inspection ===
Visual inspection testing can only be used to detect flaws on the surface of the weld but is the least expensive method of NDT. This method of inspection may be performed both during and post welding. During welding the operator is inspecting for discoloration, misalignment, notches and other surface discontinuities. Post welding inspection allows the operator to inspect for microstructural features which may be detrimental to the welded part.

=== X-ray testing ===
X-ray testing is a costly method of inspection; therefore, it is generally limited to pressure vessels and pipelines carrying hazardous materials. This method is most effective when the densities of the imperfection and the plastic have a substantial difference and is used for detection of voids, inclusions and other imperfections. A disadvantage to this method is that microstructural defects cannot be determined through this method of testing.

=== Leak-tightness test ===
This method of testing is most often used for welded pipes and other closed containers. There are different variations of this test which are dependent on the type of medium (water, air, gas) used to pressurize the sample. It is common to conduct this test in vacuum conditions.

=== High-voltage test ===
High voltage testing known as “spark test” is an alternative to the leak-tightness test. This test in performed by coating the weld with an electrically conductive substance such as a wire, fibers or coils. When a voltage is applied an arc will form, showing the presence of a leak. This test is not well suited for polar thermoplastics such as PVC as they will generate heat leading to potential degradation of the weld.

=== Ultrasonic testing ===
Ultrasonic testing uses high frequency waves that travel through the welded regions. These waves are able to detect defects based on the different densities between the imperfection and plastic part. There are two primary methods of conducting ultrasonic testing and that is by using a transmitter and receiver in conjunction or by using an ultrasonic transducer. These conventional methods similar to X-ray testing are not able to detect microstructural changes in the weld. Advanced ultrasonic testing such as phased array ultrasonics (PAUT) is currently being developed for inspection of hot plate and electrofusion joints.

Polyethylene (PE) pipes are desirable over other materials such as metals for the transportation of fluids due to their resistance to corrosion leading longer lifespans. They are however, limited from being used in nuclear power plants due unreliable NDT methods. Current methods involve using practices that do not provide a complete analysis of a welded PE pipe.

Using a butt joint configuration produces a small fusion zone and inspection is further complicated due to the high attenuation of PE. Proper probe placement is also limited during inspection due to interference with the weld bead. The PAUT system has five primary components. These components are the phased array probe, probe wedge, probe holder, scanner and flaw detector. A minimum of four phased array probes are required for the ultrasonic signal to detect a flaw. The membrane water wedge transmits the ultrasound from the probes into the pipe while minimizing energy loss and the probe holder ensures proper contact between the wedge and pipe. The scanning system made specifically for this testing method carries the probe around the joint of the pipe during inspection. Lastly, the flaw detector analyzes the signal from the probe. This method is specifically designed for inspection of electrofusion and butt fusion welds of various sized pipes ranging from a thickness of 8-65mm and a diameter of 90-800mm. PAUT is well suited for the detection of:

- Planar flaws- This may be caused by the welding surface being covered in moisture.
- Contaminants - Arid and windy environments may lead to particles attaching to the surface of the pipe.
- Cold welds - This is caused by incomplete or partial intermolecular diffusion which results in a brittle failure. Induced by cold temperatures or if there is a large gap between the pipe and fitting.
- Under penetration - This type of defect is caused by clamps not being properly secured during the welding process.

Two ISO reports are under development and being reviewed by technical committee (TC) 138 (Plastic pipes, fittings and valves for the transport of fluids) to include PAUT as a method of volumetric NDT of PE pipes. A procedure has also been made for UT of butt fusion joints including but not limited to HDPE and medium-density polyethylene (MDPE). The ISO and ASME standards are listed as:

- ISO/DTS 16943 - Thermoplastic pipes for the conveyance of fluids - Inspection of Polyethylene electrofusion socket joints using the phased array ultrasonic testing method
- ISO/DTS 22499 - Thermoplastic pipes for the conveyance of fluids - Inspection of Polyethylene butt fusion joints using the phased array ultrasonic testing method
- ASME E3044/E3044M1 − 16e1 Standard Practice for Ultrasonic Testing of Polyethylene Butt Fusion Joints
