= Pressure-sensitive tape =

Type of adhesive

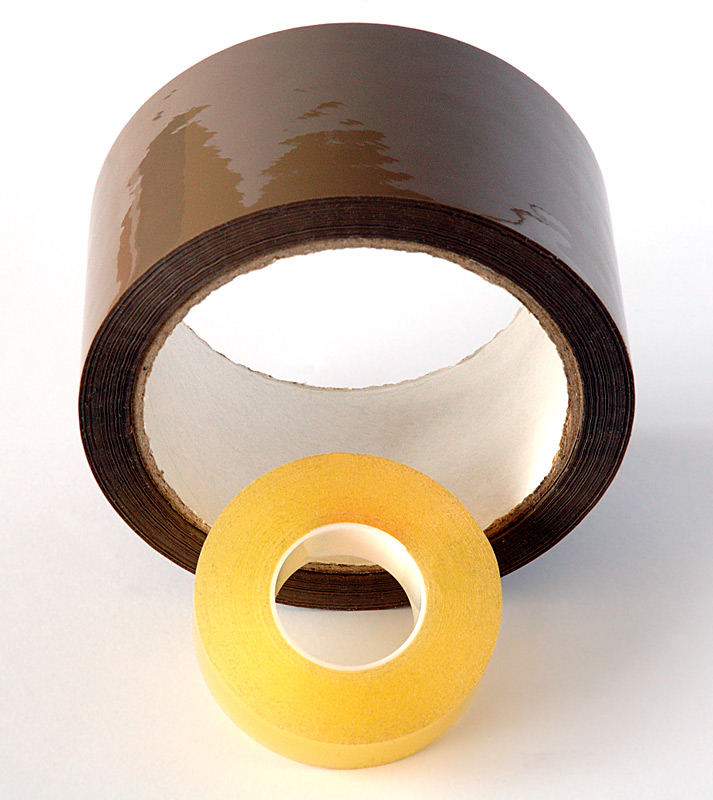
Two rolls of adhesive tape

Pressure-sensitive tape or pressure-sensitive adhesive tape (PSA tape) is an adhesive tape that sticks when pressure is applied without the need for a solvent (such as water) or heat for activation. It is also known in various countries as self-stick tape, sticky tape, or just adhesive tape and tape, as well as genericized trademarks, such as Sellotape, Durex (tape), Scotch tape, etc.

PSA tape consists of three components:

- the tape itself, which often is cellophane, cellulose acetate, or polyvinyl chloride. Other materials include paper, plastic film, cloth, or metal foil coated onto a backing material such as paper, plastic film, cloth, or metal foil.
- a pressure-sensitive adhesive.
- release liner, which keeps the tape from sticking to itself. Some have layers of adhesives, primers, release agents, filaments, printing, etc. made for specific functions.

It sticks without the need for a solvent such as water or heat for activation. By contrast, "gummed" or "water activated" adhesive tapes require warm water for activation and "heat activated" tapes require heat.

Single-sided tapes allow bonding to a surface or joining of two adjacent or overlapping materials. Double-sided tape (adhesive on both sides) allows joining of two items back-to-back.

== Varieties of PSA tape ==
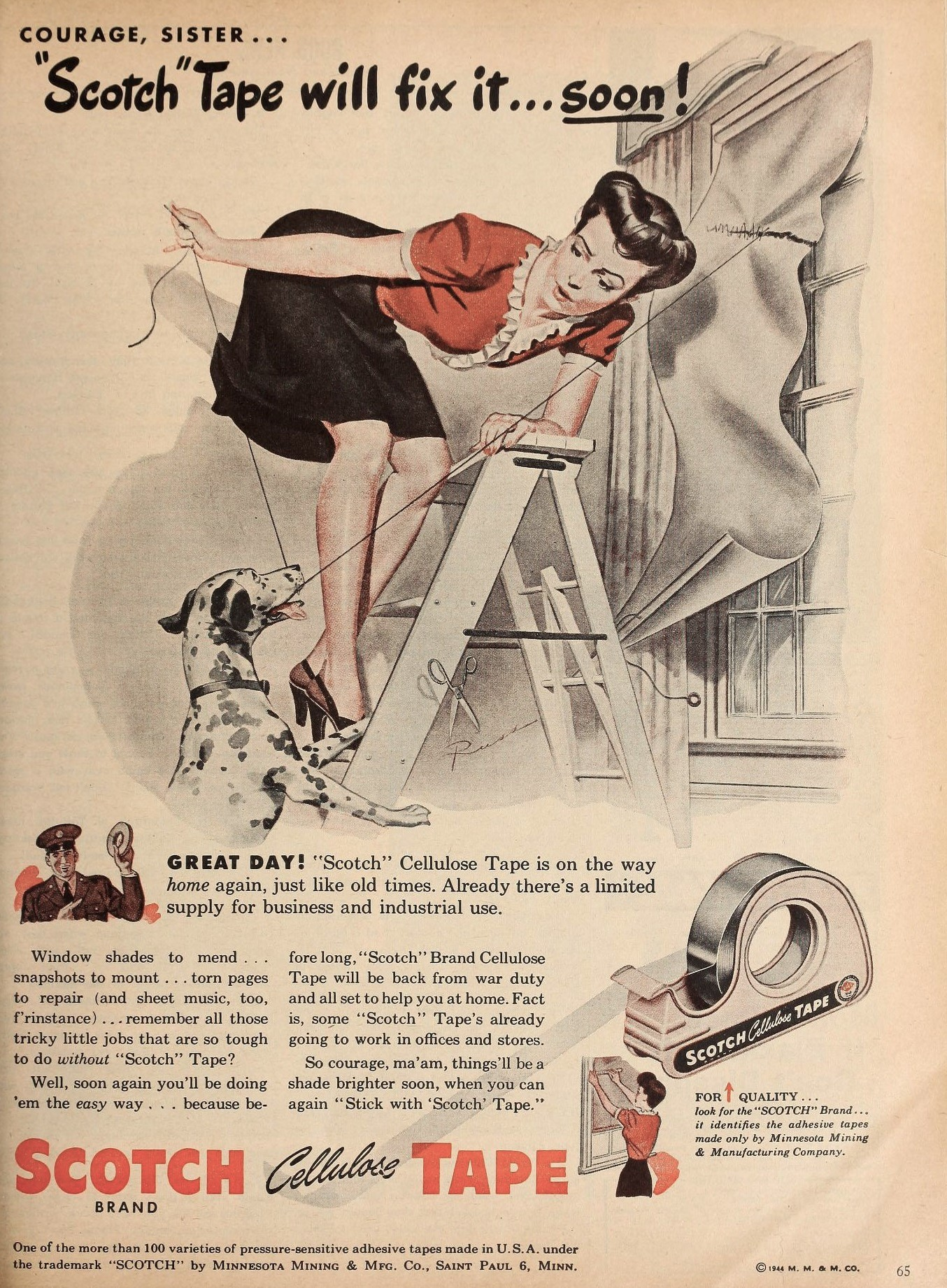
1945 advertisement for cellulose tape

- Adhesive transfer tape does not have a backing material. Instead, adhesive is on a double-coated release liner for winding on a roll. Sometimes the adhesive is sandwiched between two liners.
- Archival tape is similar to transparent office tape, with low-acid adhesives that will not degrade surfaces they are applied to, protecting documents from damage during long-term storage.
- Box-sealing tape (also "packing tape"; "parcel tape", UK) is a type of packaging tape which is clear or opaque, and used for closing packages for shipment. It is usually two inches (48 mm) or three inches (72 mm) wide and is made of a polypropylene or polyester backing.
- Drafting tape is similar to masking tape, but with lower tack adhesive so that it may be removed without damaging or leaving residue on paper or other delicate surfaces, and also has pH maintained at 7 so as not to damage the substrate.
- Duct tape usually has a plastic-coated fabric backing and a strong adhesive.
- Double-sided tape has adhesive on both sides of a backing material, for attaching two surfaces together.
- Electrical tape (or insulating tape) stretches to conform to irregular objects, and is made of materials like vinyl that do not conduct electricity.
- Filament tape or "strapping tape" has filaments (usually fiberglass) embedded into the adhesive for extra strength.
- Gaffer tape (or simply "gaff tape") is normally based on a heavy fabric or plastic tape.
- Hockey tape or "friction tape" is a somewhat rough cloth tape used for grip on hockey and lacrosse sticks.
- Masking tape is used to cover areas that should not be painted. It usually has a paper backing and an adhesive designed to be removed from surfaces (within a limited time).
- Security tape has special features to make it tamper evident
- Speed tape or "600 mile per hour tape" is a metallic foil with an adhesive designed to secure the tape under high-speed airflow and is used on the skins of airplanes
- Spike tape is a thinner version of gaffer tape that is usually brightly colored. It is used to mark places of furniture or actors on a stage.
- Surgical tape is an adhesive bandage used to hold a dressing on a wound.
- Transparent office tape is used for repairing torn paper products, sealing envelopes, general holding, etc. It is a transparent film of cellophane, cellulose, polypropylene, or other plastic, with an acrylic or synthetic rubber–based adhesive. Clear tape with a matte finish is branded "Scotch Magic Tape" or called "invisible tape". Clear tape is sold in pre-filled single-use tape dispensers and in "refill" rolls for permanent desktop tape dispensers. Famous brands include Sellotape, Scotch Tape, Duck, Tesa, LePage's, Texcel, etc.

== Tape glossary ==
- Backing. The primary component of tape upon which an adhesive is applied. Examples are cloth, paper, metal foil, plastic film, etc.
- Conformability. Ability of a tape to make total contact with a rough or uneven surface.
- Creped. Paper that has small "folds" to provide stretchability and conformability.
- Double-coated, or two-sided tape. Pressure-sensitive tape with adhesive on both sides of the carrier material.
- Gapping. Openings between layers of tape within a roll.
- Release coating. A very thin coating applied to the impervious tape backing so as to allow the tape to be unwound at a controlled level.
- Substrate. The substrate is the material to which the PSA tape must adhere.
- Tack. The sticky feel of the tape. It is the initial adhesion without rub-down.
- Telescoping. A sideways sliding of the tape layers, one over the other, so that the roll looks like a funnel or telescope.
- Unwind. The force to remove or unwind the tape from a roll.

== PSA tape standards ==
The PSA industry is in the process of unifying the several standards presently in use. The most active organizations are:

- ISO International Organization for Standardization: A European AFNOR committee is currently active in the definition of international standards; some of the most common test methods, such as Peel Adhesion, Static Shear Adhesion, Break Strength, and Elongation are presently ISO standard
- ASTM: ASTM International has several Technical Committees which write standards related to pressure-sensitive tape.
- PSTC: Pressure Sensitive Tape Council (tapes, North America)
- TLMI: Tag & Label Manufacturers Institute (labels, North America)
- AFERA: European Association for the Self Adhesive Tape Industry (tapes, Europe)
- FINAT: Féderation internationale des fabricants et transformateurs d'adhésifs et thermocollants (labels, Europe)
- JATMA: Japanese Adhesive Tapes Manufacturers Association

ASTM International has dozens of standards related to pressure-sensitive tape. Some of them are for general types of PSA tape; others are for specific types. For example, ASTM D1000 has test methods for electrical tapes. There are ASTM specifications for many tapes including D2301 for vinyl electrical tape, D5486 for box-sealing tape, etc. Several of the ASTM test methods are coordinated with PSTC, other trade associations, and other international organizations.

Following are a few examples of some ASTM standards and counterparts:

ASTM designation	ISO designation	PSTC method	AFERA method
D3121 Standard test method for tack of pressure-sensitive adhesives by rolling ball		PSTC-6	
D3330 Standard Test Method for Peel Adhesion of Pressure-Sensitive Tape	EN 1939	PSTC-101	AFERA 5001
D3654 Standard Test Methods for Shear Adhesion of Pressure-Sensitive Tapes	EN 1943	PSTC-107	AFERA 5012
D3759 Standard Test Method for Breaking Strength and Elongation of Pressure-Sensitive Tapes	EN 14410	PSTC-131	AFERA 5004
D3811 Standard test method for unwind force of pressure-sensitive tapes		PSTC-8	
D5750 Standard Guide for Width and Length of Pressure-Sensitive Tape		PSTC-71	

== Environmental considerations ==
Life cycle assessments of the tape and the item being taped are useful to identify and improve possible environmental effects. For example, there may be instances where the use of a PSA tape, compared to an alternative solution, improves the overall environmental impact, or vice versa.

Reuse or recycling are sometimes aided by a tape being removable from a surface. If a tape remains on an item during recycling, a tape should be chosen which does not hinder the recyclability of the item. For example, when taped corrugated boxes are recycled, film-backed box-sealing tapes do not hinder box recycling; the adhesive stays with the backing and is easily removed.

== Use by archives ==
Archives used PSAs to repair tear and losses of paper since around the late 1920s. This is a problem for conservation. Some applications obscure the content under it. In addition, they cause physical and chemical damage. The tape and the paper react differently to the environment, which lead to distortions. Adhesives gradually yellow, penetrate the paper, and harden. Furthermore, some adhesives dissolves ink and cause bleeding. Treatments may involve physical tools, chemicals, and temperature, depending on the material.

== See also ==
- Adhesive remover
- Chemistry of pressure-sensitive adhesives
- Drafting tape
- Label
- List of adhesive tapes
- Pressure-sensitive adhesive
- Rheology
- Scotch Tape
- Sellotape
- Tackifier
- Tape dispenser
- Tape (disambiguation)
- Triboluminescence
- Wetting

== History ==
Pressure-sensitive adhesives were first developed in 1845 by Dr. Horace Day, a surgeon. Commercial tapes were introduced in the early twentieth century. Hundreds of patents have since been published on a wide variety of formulations and constructions.
