= List of adhesive tapes =

The following is a list of adhesive tapes with pressure-sensitive adhesives:

Name	Image	Description
Aluminium tape		Thin aluminum foil, coated on one side with a heat-resistant adhesive. The side coated with adhesive is prevented from sticking together with wax paper.
Autoclave tape		Adhesive tape used in autoclaving.
Bondage tape		Adheres to itself without using sticky adhesives; this tape is used in bondage.
Box-sealing tape		Pressure-sensitive, used for sealing corrugated boxes. Adhesive is usually coated on a polypropylene or polyester film. Commonly 48 mm (1.9 in) or 72 mm (2.8 in) wide.
Copper tape		Also called slug tape; adhesive-backed copper tape used to keep slugs and snails out of certain areas.
Double-sided tape		This tape has adhesive on both sides, and is used to stick two surfaces together.
Duct tape		Usually gray in color, this tape is backed with scrim, often coated with rubber or plastic.
Elastic therapeutic tape		Also known as "K tape" and "kinesiology tape", it is an elastic-cotton strip backed with acrylic adhesive. It is used for treating athletic injuries and various physical disorders.
Electrical tape		Used to insulate electrical wires. Commonly made of black PVC (polyvinyl chloride, "vinyl"), but available in a variety of colors.
Filament tape		High-strength packaging tape made of polypropylene or polyester film, with fiberglass filaments embedded along the length.
Floor marking tape		Heavy duty floor tape used for marking areas on a floor such as in industrial warehouses.
Friction tape		Tape made of cloth which has been impregnated with a rubber-based adhesive, used mostly to increase grip or friction.
Gaffer tape		Used in the theater, film and television industry, this tape is used to secure cables to keep them out of the way, or to hide them from view.
Gorilla Tape		A trademarked brand of heavy duty duct tape.
Trace heating		Heat tape; a system used to maintain or raise the temperature of pipes and vessels to protect pipes from freezing or maintain a constant flow temperature.
Hockey tape		Used for cushioning and grip on polo mallets, ice hockey, roller hockey, and lacrosse equipment.
Hook-and-loop tape		A hook-and-loop fastener with adhesive backing.
Kapton		Used in electronic manufacturing as an insulation and protection layer on electrostatic sensitive and fragile components.
Lingerie tape		Also called "cleavage tape", "fashion tape", or "tit tape", this double-sided adhesive tape is used to keep clothing in place.
Masking tape		Used in homes and industry, this paper tape is used for masking areas. It is also used to smooth seams that will be painted over on temporary pieces.
Nano tape		Also called "gecko tape", this tape is composed of arrays of carbon nanotubes and has directional adhesion properties. It can grip a load in one direction and release its grip when the direction of force is reversed.
Pressure-sensitive tape		Adhesive tape that will stick with application pressure, without the need for solvent, heat, or water.
Road surface marking		Preformed polymer tapes that can be applied permanently or temporarily to the pavements to create road surface markings.
Scotch tape		A 3M brand name for a wide variety of office and industrial tapes.
Security tape		A tape with special tamper indicating features.
Self fusing silicone tape		A non-tacky tape which when stretched and wrapped around cables, electrical joints, hoses and pipes will amalgamate itself into a strong seamless rubbery, waterproof, and electrically insulating layer.
Sellotape		A British brand name, a general-purpose clear home and office tape. The name is often used as a generic term for similar tapes in the UK.
Speed tape		Used on aircraft, this aluminized tape is designed to remain in place in high winds.
Spike		This is a marking tape used in the theater, film and television industry to mark areas on a stage for actors.
Wound closure strip		A medical tape.
Surgical tape		A medical tape.
Stretch-release adhesive		Adhesive type manufactured by 3M.
Tear tape		Allows for easy opening of fast-moving consumer goods. May also carry brand messaging, anti-tampering, and authentication technologies.
Toupee tape		Invisible double-sided tape used to attach hair pieces or to hold delicate fabrics against the skin.
Reflective tape		High-visibility adhesive tape with retroreflective sheeting.
Thread seal tape		Polytetrafluoroethylene (PTFE) non-adhesive film tape commonly used in plumbing for sealing pipe threads.
Ultra-high-molecular-weight polyethylene tape		Abrasion resistant and low friction tape made out of ultra-high-molecular-weight polyethylene (UHMWPE), useful to protect wear surfaces.
