= Double-sided tape =

Tape that is adhesive on both sides

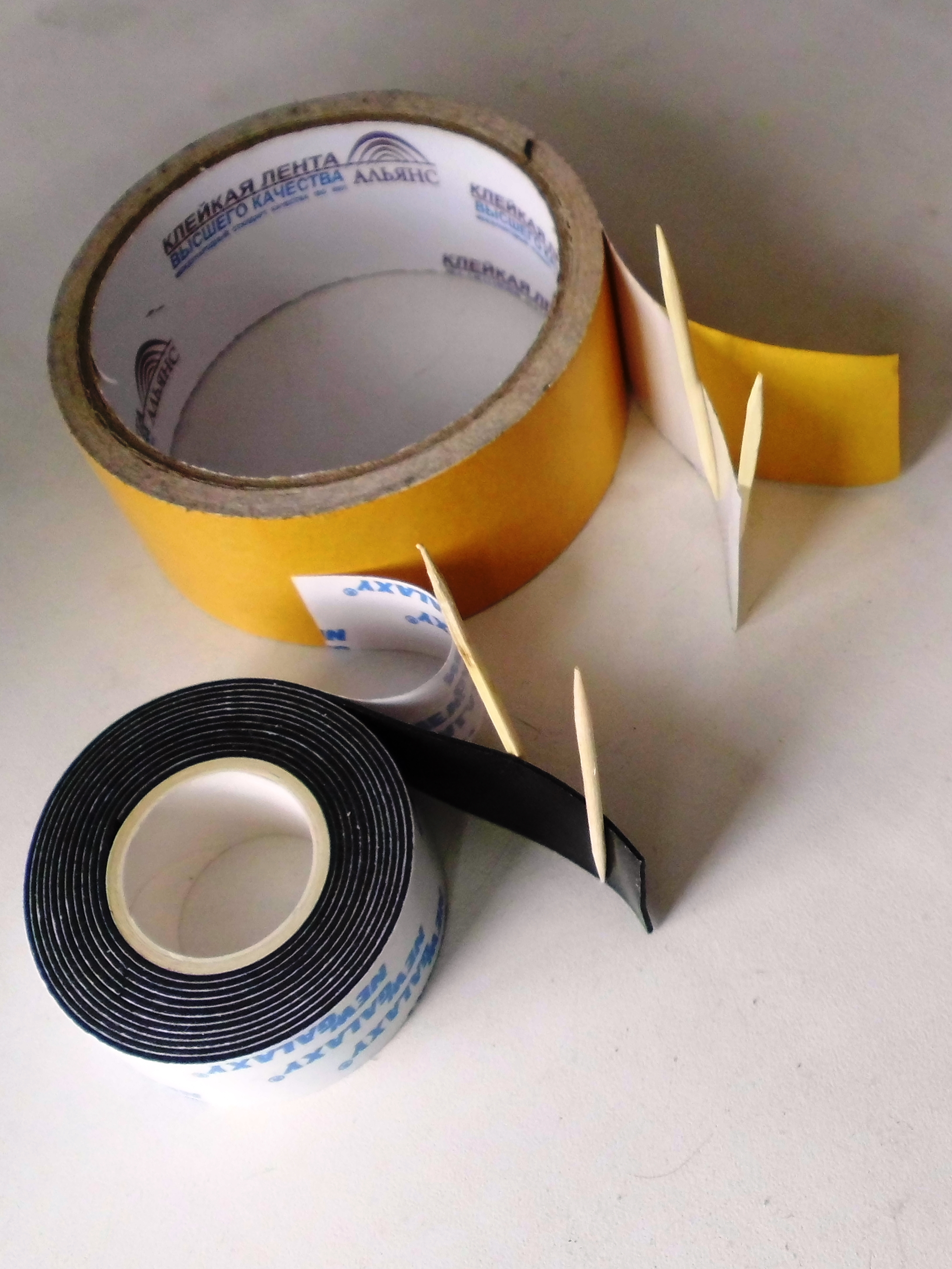
Double-sided tapes

Double-sided tape is any pressure-sensitive tape that is coated with adhesive on both sides. It is designed to stick two surfaces together, often in a way which is not visible in the end product, due to it being in between the objects rather than overlaying them. This allows for neater-looking projects and better craftsmanship. Double-sided tape can be either thin or dimensional. Dimensional tape is thicker, and is of particular use to retail and signage uses where it can be used to allow signs or displays to stand out with a 3-D effect.

Double-sided tape is created by applying a thin adhesive layer to each side of a carrier material. For example, double-sided tissue tape, an easy-to-rip double-sided tape, is created by applying adhesive to two sides of tissue paper, which is then wound with a silicone paper to avoid it sticking to itself. Most adhesive tapes are manufactured in log form, such as a large 1 to 3 meter wide roll, and then an adhesive tape converter is used to slit the rolls into the required widths.

One type of double-sided tape, known as lingerie tape, secures clothing to skin, and is used with strapless dresses or loose skirts, and as a temporary fix for fallen hems and other clothing imperfections.

A patent for double-sided adhesive tape was filed in 1987 by Dean Waldenberger on behalf of Norton Company.

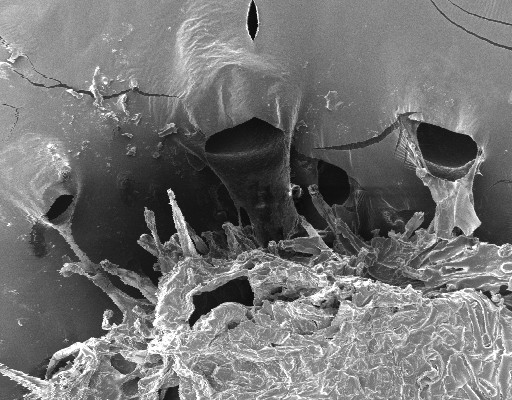
A leaf sticking to double-sided tape looked at with a scanning electron microscope

== See also ==
- Adhesive tape
- Duct tape
- Masking tape
- Electrical tape
- List of adhesive tapes
