= Plastics in the construction industry =

Plastic is the generic name for a family of synthetic materials derived from petrochemicals. It is often product of two or more components.

There are many families of plastics and polymers being used in construction industry, such as acrylics, composites, expanded polystyrene, polycarbonates, polyethylene, polypropylene, and polyvinyl chloride.

== Merits and Limitations ==
Plastics are very versatile construction materials. The unique properties of plastics allow them to form tight seals, and they are useful as both thermal and electrical insulators. Plastics are strong yet lightweight, so they are easy to transport & maneuver. They are also durable and resistant to bumps and scratches. They do not rot or corrode (like wood or metal), and have excellent weatherability. Plastics can be shaped for use by extrusion, bending, molding, and cutting, allowing a wide variety of shapes to be made of plastic. Plastics can also be made any color through the addition of pigments.

Nevertheless, there are limitations to the use of plastic. Plastics have a low modulus of elasticity, which makes them unsuitable for load-bearing applications. Plastics can also degrade when exposed to sunlight, and many types of plastic soften and deform when heated. Plastics are also flammable and often release toxic fumes when burnt. They are not biodegradable and difficult to recycle, so they are not an environmentally friendly building material.

== Products ==
Below are some uses for plastics in the construction industry:

- Pipes for rain water, sewage, gas distribution, and organizing wires may be made of plastic.
- Cable insulation and insulating tape is usually made of plastic.
- Plastic may be used in flooring and roofing materials.
- Doors, window panels, and skylights may be made of plastic.
- Washers, nuts, bolts, and other hardware might be made of plastic.
- Insulating materials are often made of plastic.
- Plastic can be used to build temporary and portable structures, such as tents and sheds.
