= Drafting tape =

Type of tape used by artists

Drafting tape, also known as artist's tape, is similar to masking tape in that it has a wide variety of uses, but differs in several key areas.

- Drafting tape should not leave a sticky residue behind
- Drafting tape is easily removable, even from delicate surfaces like paper. Drafting tape should not tear the paper during removal. This is the main reason engineers and architects use this kind of tape in their blueprints.
- Drafting tape should have a neutral pH.
- Drafting tape is slightly more water-resistant to help with masking for paint.

While the obvious use of drafting tape is for drawing, drafting tape, like masking tape, can also be used for labeling and hanging posters. Its white or cream coloring goes well with many other colors, and it can be written on easily with any felt-tipped marker. In addition, drafting tape costs less than conventional labels, and its low cost also makes it more forgiving of errors. Drafting tape can also be used in technical drawing to help keep the paper well positioned and ensure no residue is left behind when removed. Drafting tape is designed to be temporary, so it may disintegrate over time.

Drafting tape is not nearly as strong as duct tape or gaffer tape; it will break with minimal effort, it has very little odor, smelling like glue and paper, and it is not waterproof.

Painter's tape, or "blue tape", behaves similarly to artist's tape however painter's tape is not acid free and is meant for household use instead of art use.

== See also ==
- List of adhesive tapes
