= Tape =

Tape or Tapes may refer to:

== Material ==
Tape is long, narrow, thin strip of material usually used to stick things together. (see also Ribbon (disambiguation):

=== Adhesive tapes ===
- Adhesive tape

=== Markings or signals ===
- Barricade tape, also known as caution tape or police tape, resilient plastic tape of a signal color to catch the attention of passerby
- Detectable tape, a tape buried near underground structures to make them visible to utility location devices
- Flagging (tape), a colored non-adhesive tape used in marking objects

=== Recording media ===
- Audiotape, a recording of audio onto magnetic tape
- Compact Cassette or cassette tape, a magnetic tape recording format for audio recording and playback
- Digital Audio Tape (DAT), a signal recording and playback medium developed by Sony and introduced in 1987
- Digital Compact Cassette (DCC), a magnetic tape sound recording format introduced by Philips and Matsushita in late 1992 and marketed as the successor to the standard analog Compact Cassette
- Digital Tape Format, a magnetic tape data storage format developed by Sony
- Magnetic tape, a medium for magnetic recording, made of a thin magnetizable coating on a long, narrow strip of plastic film
  - Magnetic tape data storage, uses digital recording on magnetic tape to store digital information
- Punched tape or paper tape, a long strip of paper in which holes are punched to store data
- Reel-to-reel audio tape recording, magnetic tape audio recording in which the recording medium is held on a reel, rather than being contained within a cassette
- Tape drive, a data storage device that reads and writes data on a magnetic tape
- Tape recorder, an audio storage device that records and plays back sounds using magnetic tape
  - Tape head, a type of transducer used in tape recorders to convert electrical signals to magnetic fluctuations and vice versa
- Ticker tape, the earliest digital electronic communications medium, transmitting stock price information over telegraph lines
- Videotape, a recording of images and sounds onto magnetic tape as opposed to film stock used in filmmaking or random access digital media

=== Other functions ===
- Barbed tape or razor wire, a mesh of metal strips with sharp edges whose purpose is to prevent passage by humans
- Bubble Tape, a brand of bubble gum produced by Wm. Wrigley Jr. Company
- Tape (surveying), used in surveying for measuring horizontal, vertical, or slope distances
- Tape measure, or measuring tape, a flexible form of ruler
- Thread seal tape, also known as plumber's tape or "Teflon tape", film for use in sealing pipe threads

== Arts, entertainment, and media ==
=== Films ===
- Tape (2001 film), a 2001 movie directed by Richard Linklater
- Tape (2020 film), a 2020 movie directed by Deborah Kampmeier
- Tape (play), a 1999 play by Stephen Belber

=== Music ===
- "Tape", a 2018 song by Brockhampton from Iridescence
- The Tape (album), Kid Capri album
- Tape (album), Patty Griffin album

=== Television ===
- TAPE Inc., a television production company in the Philippines
- "The Tape", a Seinfeld episode

== People ==
- Seb Tape (born 1992), Australian rules footballer

== Places ==
- Tape, Burma, a river village in Homalin Township
- Tapes, Rio Grande do Sul, a municipality in Rio Grande do Sul, Brazil

== Other uses ==
- Red tape, a colloquialism for heavy or undesirable bureaucratic process
- Tapai (also tapay or tape), a traditional fermented food found throughout much of Southeast Asia and parts of East Asia

== See also ==
- Ribbon (disambiguation)
- Spike (stagecraft), a marking, usually made with a piece of tape, put on or around the stage
- Strapping
