= Etola =

Finnish company

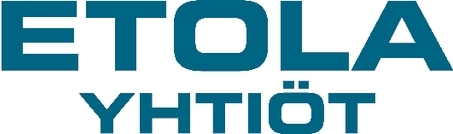
- Founded: 1932 Finland
- Key people: Erkki Etola
- Revenue: 390,000,000 (2018)
- Number of employees: 1500 (2007)
- Website: www.etola.fi/en/

Etola is a Finnish family-owned company consisting of about 30 specialty stores and several companies. The companies’ total turnover is approximately 400 million euros and the staff is about 1,600 employees. The group’s main business areas are industrial rubber, plastics, tapes, wire and cable accessories, occupational safety products, seals, fastening products, and hydraulics.

Etola yhtiöt is organized as a group of companies.

== History ==
Etola was founded by Johan August Etholén in the early 1930s. After being let go from his job due to the poor economic situation, Etholén bought three rubber shops. As the business began to expand, Etholén started manufacturing various rubber products. There were shops in Turku and two in Helsinki, one of the Helsinki shops still being in operation. Etholén’s son, Commercial Counsellor Nils A. Etola, headed the Etola Group for a long time. His work has been continued by his son, Erkki Etola.

== The Group ==
Etola Group is a Finnish group of companies that imports, manufactures, and markets industrial products and supplies, comprising several companies that operate in close cooperation. Sales of industrial products began in 1956.

In addition to the group’s traditional rubber and plastic products, the product range today also includes occupational safety products, fastening products, and hydraulics, as well as bearings and power transmission components, tools and power tools, grinding and welding equipment and supplies, electronic components, and property maintenance equipment and supplies. In addition to industrial products, the Etola Group includes the retail chain Talous Etola, the marine specialty store Maritim, and Kumuko, which operates in the building materials sector.

For commodity products, Etola works in cooperation with major international market leaders, while it manufactures specialty products itself in Finland.

== Sectors ==
=== Plastics ===
- Okartek Oy
- Etra Engineering Plastic
- Foiltek Oy
- Thermoplast Oy

=== Hydraulics ===
- Nestepaine Oy
- Euro-Hydro Oy
- Jon-Hydro Oy
- Flexo-Tekniikka Oy Ab
- Hytaflex

=== Fastening equipments ===
- Pameto|Pameto Oy Ab
- Pameto Production
- Pameto Electronics
- Pameto / Suomen pultti

=== Seals ===
- Tiivistekeskus Oy
- Tiivistetekniikka Oy

=== Others ===
- Etra Electronics Oy
- Euro-Kumi Oy
- Kumipalvelu Oy, safety gloves
- Etra Tapes and Electrical Solutions
- Hitsisalo Oy
- Kone Pajula Oy
- Rusanen Tekstiilipalvelut Oy
- Canter Oy

=== Foreign countries ===
- Baltic states: Baltflex As, Etra Baltic
- Sweden: Tätringen Tekniska
- China: Etola Industrial Products
