= Wound closure strip =

Porous surgical tape used for closing small wounds

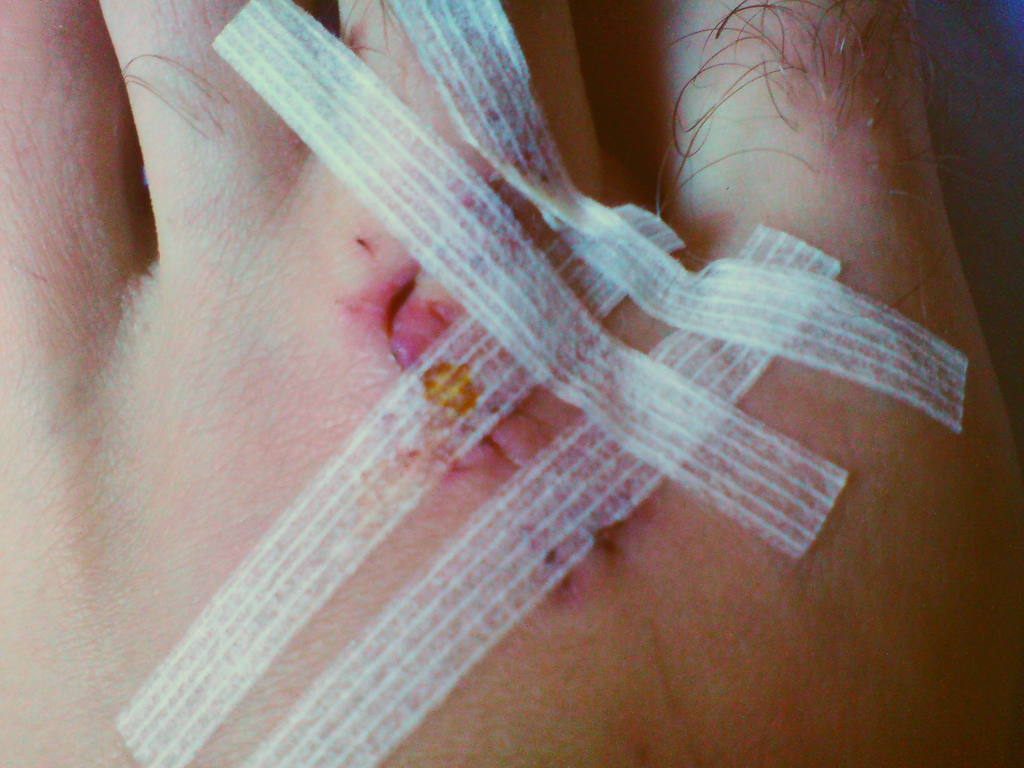
Wound closure strips applied to a cut on the top of the foot

Wound closure strips are porous surgical tape strips which can be used to close small wounds. They are applied across the laceration in a manner which pulls the skin on either side of the wound together. Wound closure strips may be used instead of sutures (stitches) in some injuries, because they lessen scarring and are easier to care for.

== Names ==
Wound closure strips are often referred to using the genericized trademark Steri-Strips, the brand name used by 3M's Nexcare. The precursor to the Steri-Strip was 3M's Micropore brand of microporous surgical tape.

== Usage ==
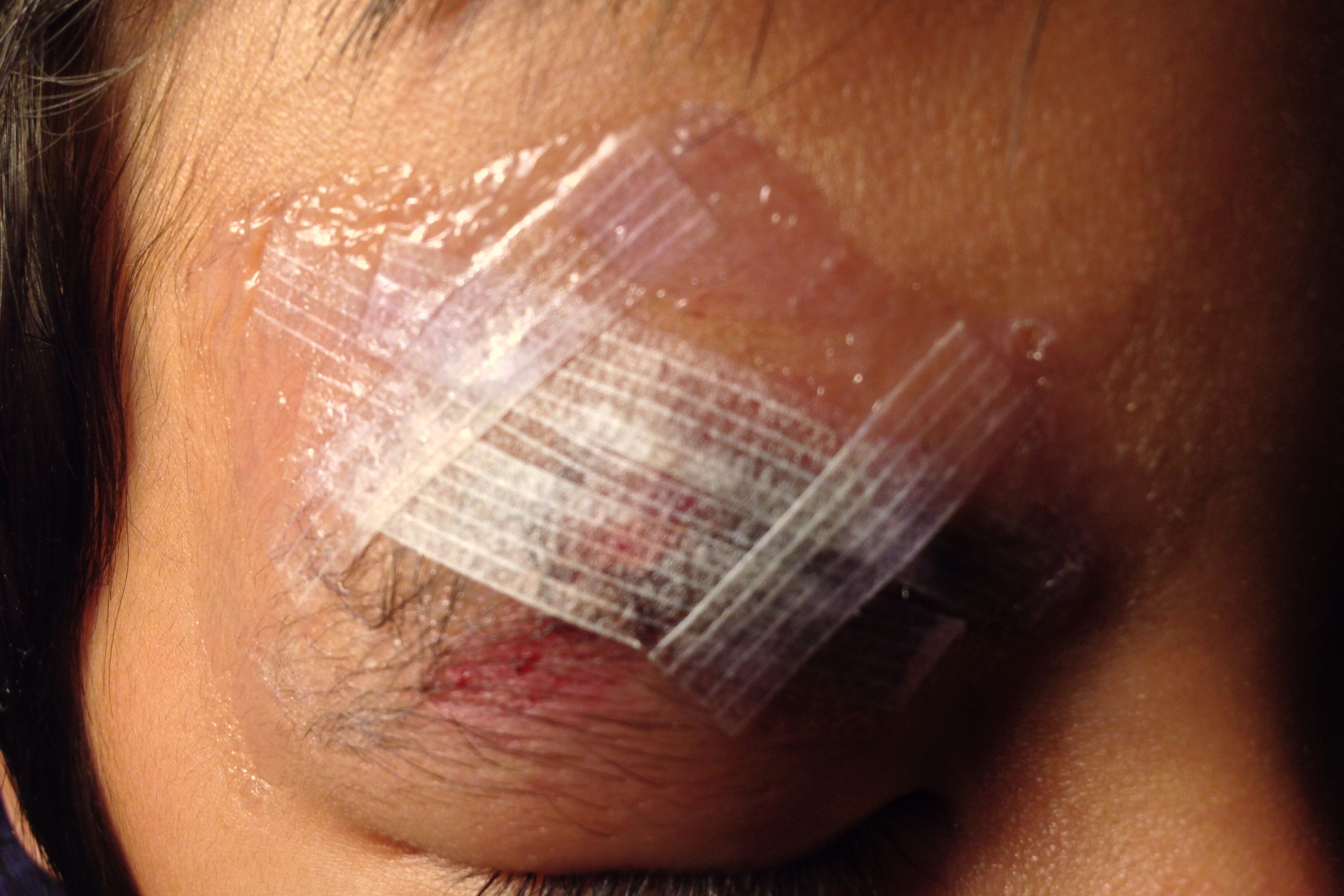
Wound care with Steri-Strip tape and glue

Wound closure strips are ideal for use in highly contoured areas or areas of musculoskeletal movements, such as joints. They are also for use in areas where swelling, edema, hematomas, or bloating may occur. Additionally, they provide wound support following early suture or staple removal. Wound closure strips may also be applied together with special glue (e.g. 2-Octyl cyanoacrylate, also known as Dermabond) to secure the wound.

== Benefits ==
The porous fabric of Steri-Strips allows more fresh air to the wound and prevent skin maceration. Plastic or other non-porous bandages often prevent perspiration and other bodily fluids from drying and are more likely to cause the wound to be macerated, which increases risk of bacterial or fungal infection. Steri-strips result in less scarring when compared to staples or sutures. They present a lesser chance of infection than sutures or staples.

== Variations ==
1. Reinforced skin closures: These are sterile skin closure strips that are made of a porous, non-woven backing coated with a pressure-sensitive, hypoallergenic adhesive and reinforced with polyester filaments for added strength. They provide general wound support for increased tensile strength and finer wound edge approximation.
2. Blend tone skin closures non-reinforced: These are sterile, light beige skin closure strips made of a porous, non-woven backing coated with a pressure sensitive, hypoallergenic adhesive. They blend with and allow the natural skin tone (of light beige people) to show through. They are for use in areas where a cosmetically pleasing appearance is desirable, such as the face or arms.
3. Butterfly closure strips: Butterfly closures are a type of adhesive strip consisting of two connected adhesive pads. The pads are attached to either side of the wound to hold the wound closed. Like wound closure strips, butterfly closures do not require a medical professional to apply and can result in improved cosmetic outcomes for small wounds, compared to surgical sutures.
4. Waterproof closure strips: Steri-Strips are paper-based, so durability and usage can be compromised if they get wet, requiring dryness and precision. But some variations are made of a synthetic material that will repel water and therefore remain in place longer. The alternative 'butterfly' version of the strips, with two broader pads, has also waterproof variants.

== Alternatives ==
Some forms of cyanoacrylate glue may also be used for similar purposes. There are three cyanoacrylate compounds currently available as topical skin adhesives. 2-Octyl cyanoacrylate is marketed as Dermabond, SurgiSeal, and more recently LiquiBand Exceed. n-Butyl cyanoacrylate is marketed as Histoacryl, Indermil, GluStitch, GluSeal, PeriAcryl, and LiquiBand. The compound ethyl 2-cyanoacrylate is available as Epiglu.

== See also ==
- Dressing (medical)
- Instruments used in general surgery
- List of adhesive tapes
