= Filament tape =

Reinforced pressure-sensitive film

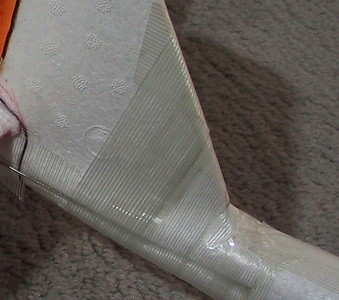
Filament tape used to mend a model airplane

Filament tape or strapping tape is a pressure-sensitive tape consisting of a pressure-sensitive adhesive coated onto a backing material which is usually a polypropylene or polyester film and fiberglass filaments embedded to add high tensile strength.

It is used for several packaging functions such as closing corrugated fiberboard boxes, reinforcing packages, bundling items, pallet unitizing, etc.

The first filament tape was invented in 1956 by Cyrus W. Bemmels, a scientist working for Johnson and Johnson. Several other varieties have since been developed.

A variety of grades of filament tape are available. Some have as much as 600 pounds of tensile strength per inch of width (100 N/mm). Different types and grades of adhesive are also available.

Most often, the tape is 12 to 24 mm (1/2 to 1 inch) wide, but it is also used in other widths.

A variety of strengths, calipers, and adhesive formulations are available.

== Uses ==
The tape is most often used as a closure for corrugated boxes such as a full overlap box, five-panel folder, full telescope box. L-shaped clips or strips are applied over the overlapping flap, extending 50–75 mm (2–3 in) onto the box panels.

Heavy loads or weak box construction may also be aided by the application of strips or bands of filament tape to the box.

== Application ==
The tape can be applied manually with a stationary dispenser but is more often applied with a hand held tape dispenser: this allows the user to more efficiently place the tape on the box, cut it off, and rub it down.

Automated machinery for application of tape to high speed lines is also common.

== Related products ==
Some PSA tapes are available which have a highly oriented polypropylene backing with high strength in the long (machine) direction. Some of these have shaped filaments which help resist tearing across the tape. These tapes are sometimes used in a similar manner as filament reinforced tapes.

Some filament tapes (or strapping tapes) are sometimes used similarly to strapping.

== See also ==
- List of adhesive tapes
