= Gorilla Tape =

Brand of reinforced duct tape

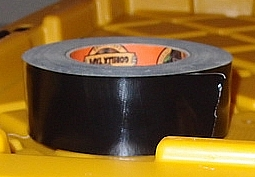
A roll of Gorilla tape

Gorilla Tape is an American brand of adhesive tape sold by Sharonville, Ohio based Gorilla Glue Inc. Introduced in late 2005, Gorilla Tape is a reinforced form of duct tape and was featured in Popular Science's "Best of What's New 2006". Gorilla Tape is available in several sizes and colors, including camouflage, white and clear.

== Composition ==
Gorilla Tape incorporates a three-layer construction: a weather-resistant outer shell, reinforced fabric backing, and an adhesive layer that is twice as thick as the adhesive found on duct tape, which Popular Science says allows it to better surround and grip uneven surfaces. To prevent premature tearing, the two layers of fabric backing are slightly offset, making the tape 145% stronger than duct tape, while still allowing it to be torn by hand.

== Reaction ==
Stephen Regenold, reviewing the product for Gear Junkie, stated that in his tests of the product, it performed as promised, sticking to nearly any type of surface to which he applied it, including a tear on a down jacket, and that the Gorilla Tape held onto the jacket without stretching or any compromise, and managed to keep the insulation from escaping for an entire winter of skiing and hiking. However, while Regenold stated that Gorilla Tape was ideal for outdoor repairs, its greater thickness and weight make it suboptimal for things like blister repair, stating that in contrast, duct tape provides, "zero resistance inside a sock".

Gorilla Tape was featured in Popular Science's "Best of What's New 2006", which commented on the product, "Oh, what MacGyver could have done with the new Gorilla Tape in place of his beloved gray stuff."

== See also ==
- List of adhesive tapes
