= Friction tape =

Adhesive tape

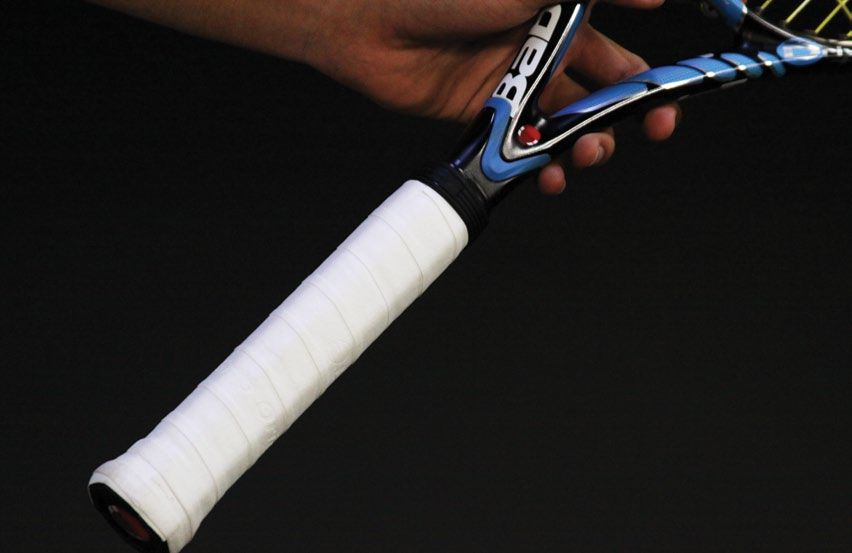
Friction tape on a tennis racket handle

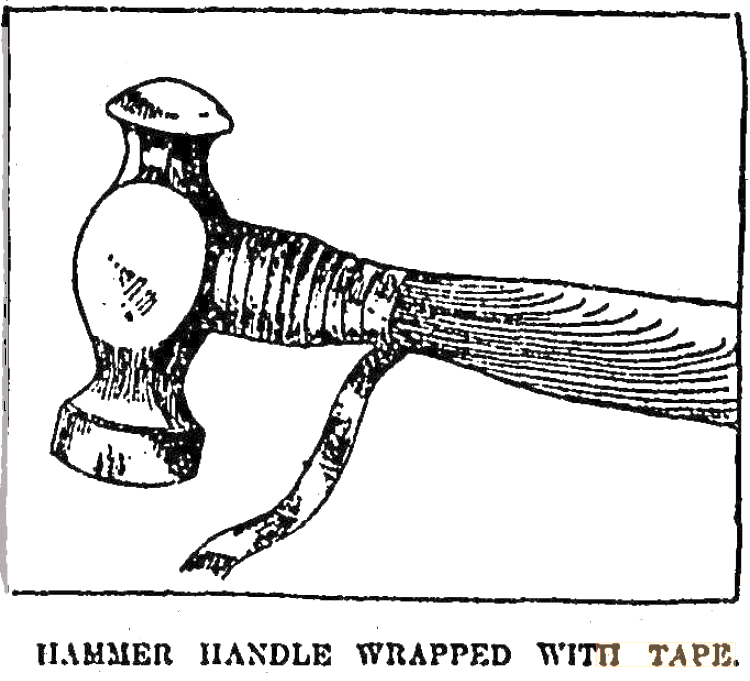
Friction tape repair 1909

Friction tape is a type of woven cloth adhesive tape, historically made of cotton, impregnated with a rubber-based adhesive. Sticky on both sides, it is mainly used by electricians to insulate splices in electric wires and cables. The rubber-based adhesive provides a degree of protection from liquids and corrosion, while the cloth mesh protects against punctures and abrasion. It has been supplanted by PVC-based electrical tape except commonly used for over wrapping.

== Other uses ==
Friction tape is commonly used to improve the grip on various sporting implements, including tennis racquets, baseball bats, and hockey sticks. It is also used similarly on the handlebars of bicycles, dirt bikes, lawnmowers, and other small machines that require gripping or steering.

== See also ==
- List of adhesive tapes
