= Chatterton's compound =

Waterproof insulating compound

Chatterton’s compound is an adhesive waterproof insulating compound that was used in early submarine telegraph cables. It was patented in 1859 by John Chatterton and Willoughby Smith.

Its constitution is as follows:

- 3 parts gutta-percha
- 1 part rosin
- 1 part Stockholm tar

Chatterton's Compound was also used to stick insulating paper to armatures, for example those on Synchronome clocks, which were the most accurate clocks made in the early part of the 20th century. If the paper appeared to be in bad condition it could be removed by warming up the armature near a flame and replacing it.

Chatterton's Compound was used in the manufacture of pneumatic pipe organs to seal lead tubing into wooden blocks for the pneumatic action, or, particularly in the UK, to affix reed weights to the reed tongues. It is still used in historical restoration jobs for this purpose but has been replaced with modern materials on more recent builds.

Chatterton's Compound was much used by submarine cable technicians for various purposes around oversea telegraph offices prior to the 1960s; it could be used as an adhesive or in jointing gutta-percha-insulated submarine telegraph cables. It was available in round black sticks of about 3/4 inch diameter which responded to heat from a spirit lamp. It was known to telegraph technicians as 'chats'.

In France, the normal black PVC electrical insulating tape is often referred to as chatterton. Also as a result of French colonization of Syria, this naming is also widely used in Syrian Arabic.
