= Autoclave tape =

Adhesive tape used in autoclaving (heating under high pressure with steam to sterilise)

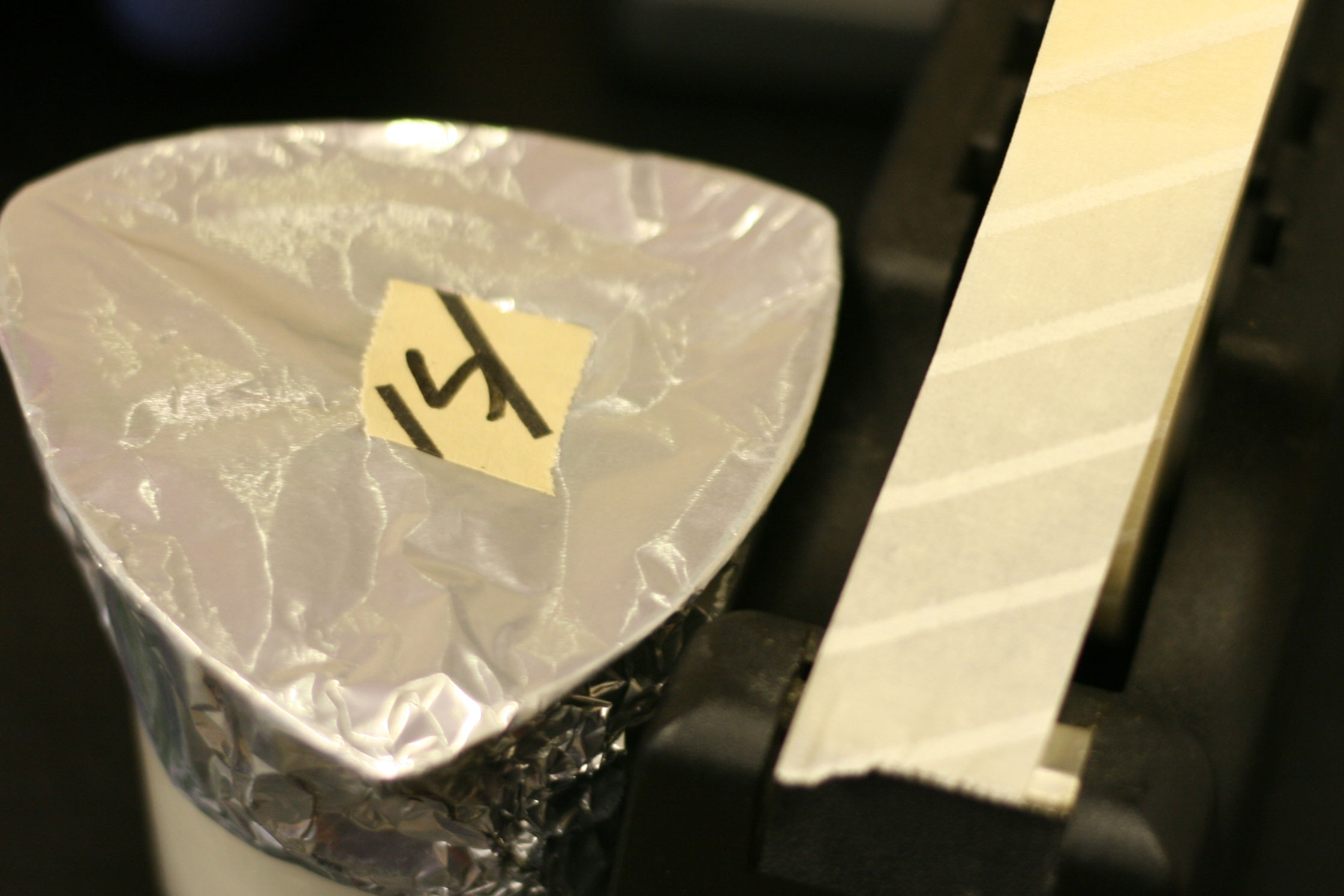
Autoclaved (left) and unautoclaved (right) autoclave tape

Autoclave tape is an adhesive tape used in autoclaving (heating under high pressure with steam to sterilise) to indicate whether a specific temperature has been reached. Autoclave tape works by changing color after exposure to temperatures commonly used in sterilization processes, typically 121°C in a steam autoclave.

Small strips of the tape are applied to the items before they are placed into the autoclave. The tape is similar to masking tape but slightly more adhesive, to allow it to adhere under the hot, moist conditions of the autoclave. One such tape has diagonal markings containing an ink which changes colour (usually beige or blue to black) upon heating.

The presence of autoclave tape that has changed color on an item does not ensure that the product is sterile, as the tape will change color upon exposure only. For steam sterilization to occur, the entire item must completely reach and maintain 121°C for 15–20 minutes with proper steam exposure to ensure sterilization.

The color-changing indicator of tape is usually lead carbonate based, which decomposes to lead(II) oxide. To protect users from lead – and because this decomposition can occur at many moderate temperatures – manufactures may protect the lead carbonate layer with a resin or polymer that is degraded under steam at high temperature.
