= Gaffer tape =

Heavy cotton cloth pressure-sensitive tape

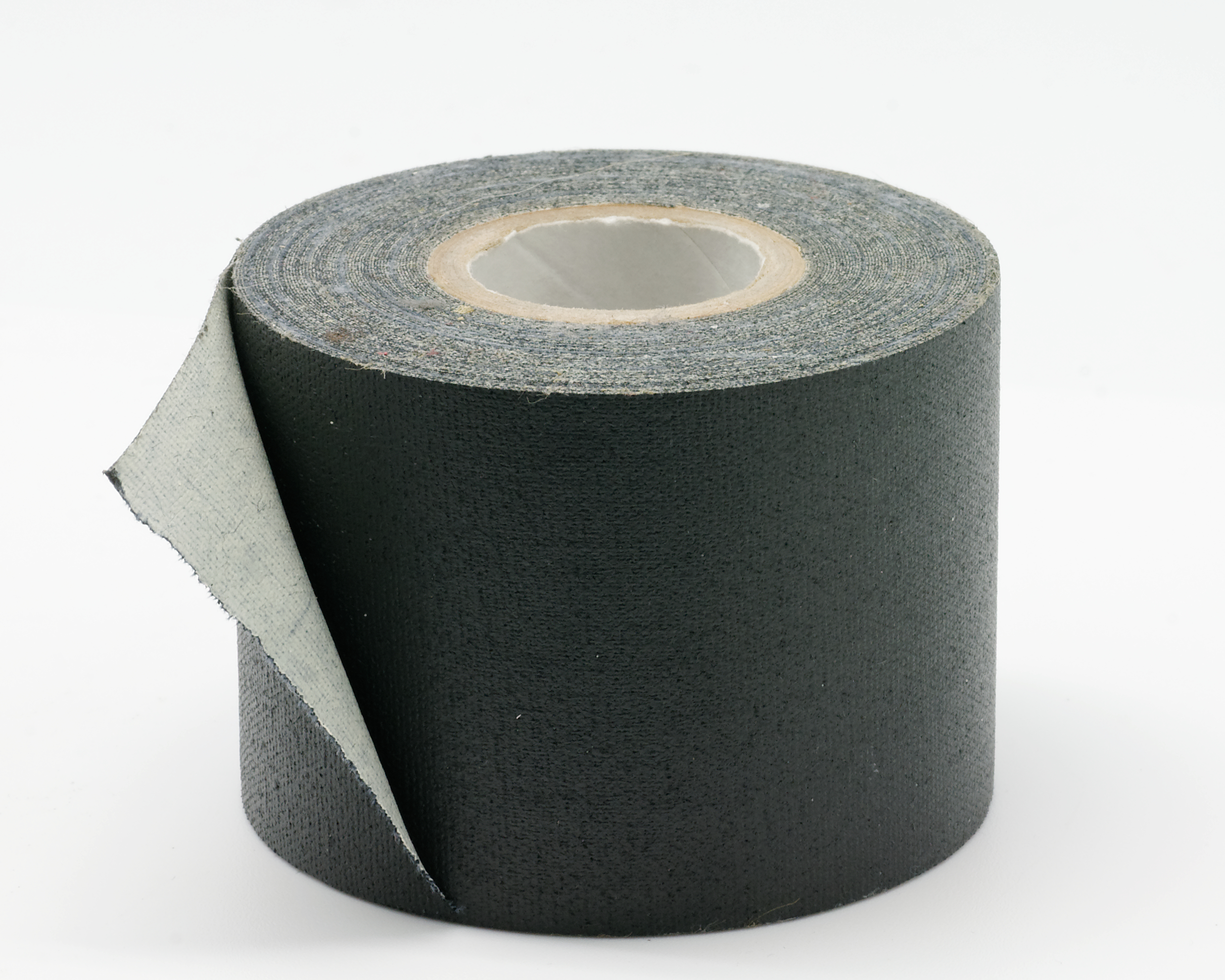
Matte black gaffer tape

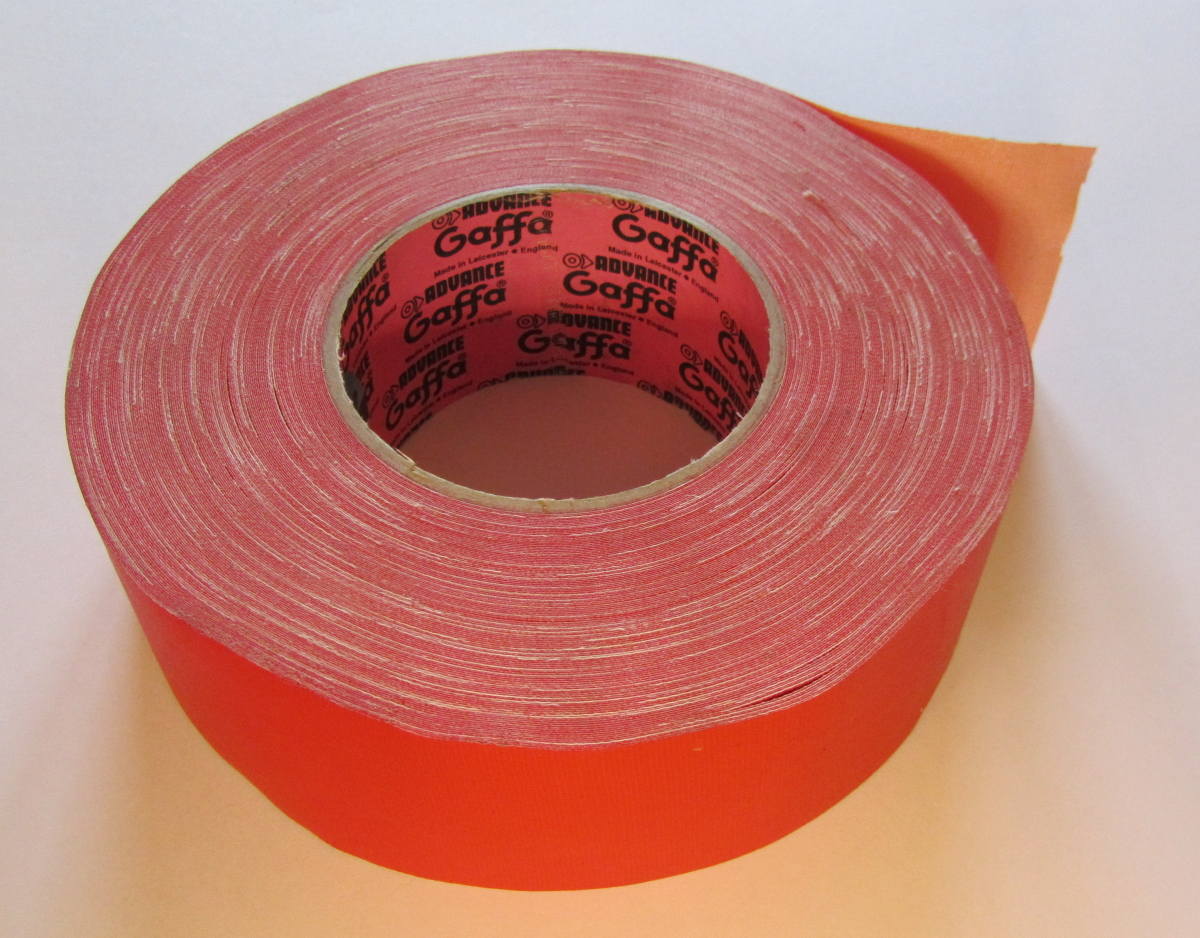
Red gaffer tape

Gaffer tape (also known as gaffer's tape, gaff tape or gaffa tape as well as spike tape for narrow, colored gaffer tape) is a heavy cotton cloth pressure-sensitive tape with strong adhesive and tensile properties. It is widely used in theatre, photography, film, radio and television production, and industrial staging work.

While sometimes confused with duct tape, gaffer tape differs in the composition of both the backing, which is made from fabric as opposed to vinyl or other plastics, and the adhesive, which is more resistant to heat and more easily removed without damaging the surface to which it adhered.

== History ==
The precise origin of the name is unknown, one hypothesis being that it is named for the gaffer (chief lighting technician) on a film crew. When cables are taped down on a stage or other surface, either to prevent tripping hazards or conceal them from view of the audience or camera, they are said to be gaffed or gaffered.

Gaffer tape was invented in 1959 by the director and cinematographer Ross Lowell. Lowell reworked Johnson & Johnson's Permacel duct tape product by combining the Permacel adhesive with a silver fabric backing to create gaffer tape which could hold a flat metal plate to a window.

== Properties and uses ==
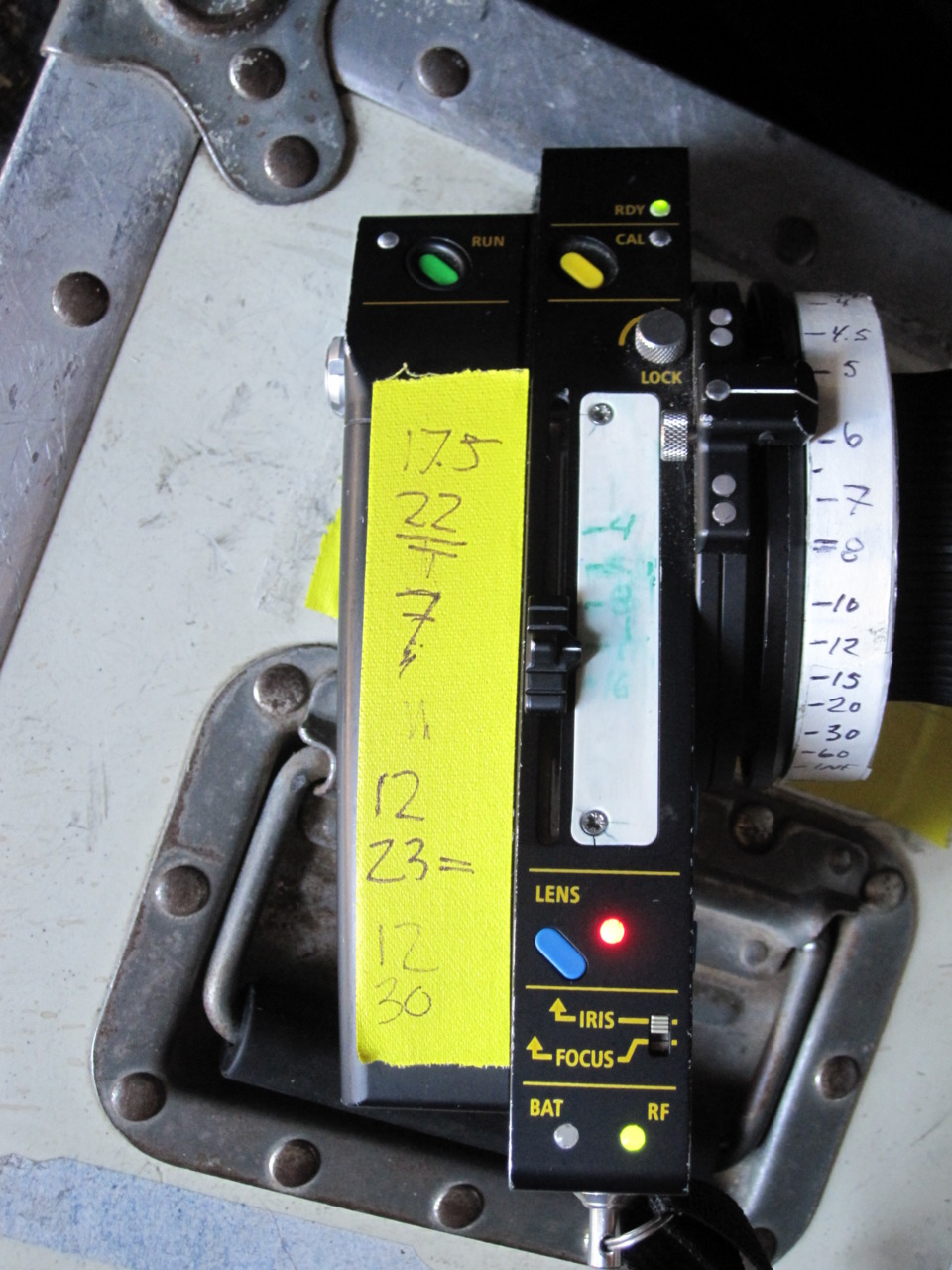
Yellow gaffer tape used for marking a camera department remote on a film set

Gaffer tape is manufactured in many colors, including fluorescent and custom colors, but perhaps the most common variety is matte black. A matte finish keeps the tape from reflecting light, so that it blends in with a typical stage floor. It is sold in a variety of widths, from 1/4 in (6 mm) to 4 in (102 mm), with 1 in (25 mm) and 2 in (51 mm) being the most common. Gaffer tape is strong, yet can be torn by hand, so no cutting tools are necessary, and it can easily be ripped into narrower strips when desired. The synthetic adhesive typically leaves little or no residue and will generally not damage most surfaces when it is removed. Gaffer tape is usually more expensive than duct tape because it is manufactured in smaller quantities, has more exacting specifications, and is marketed for professional use.

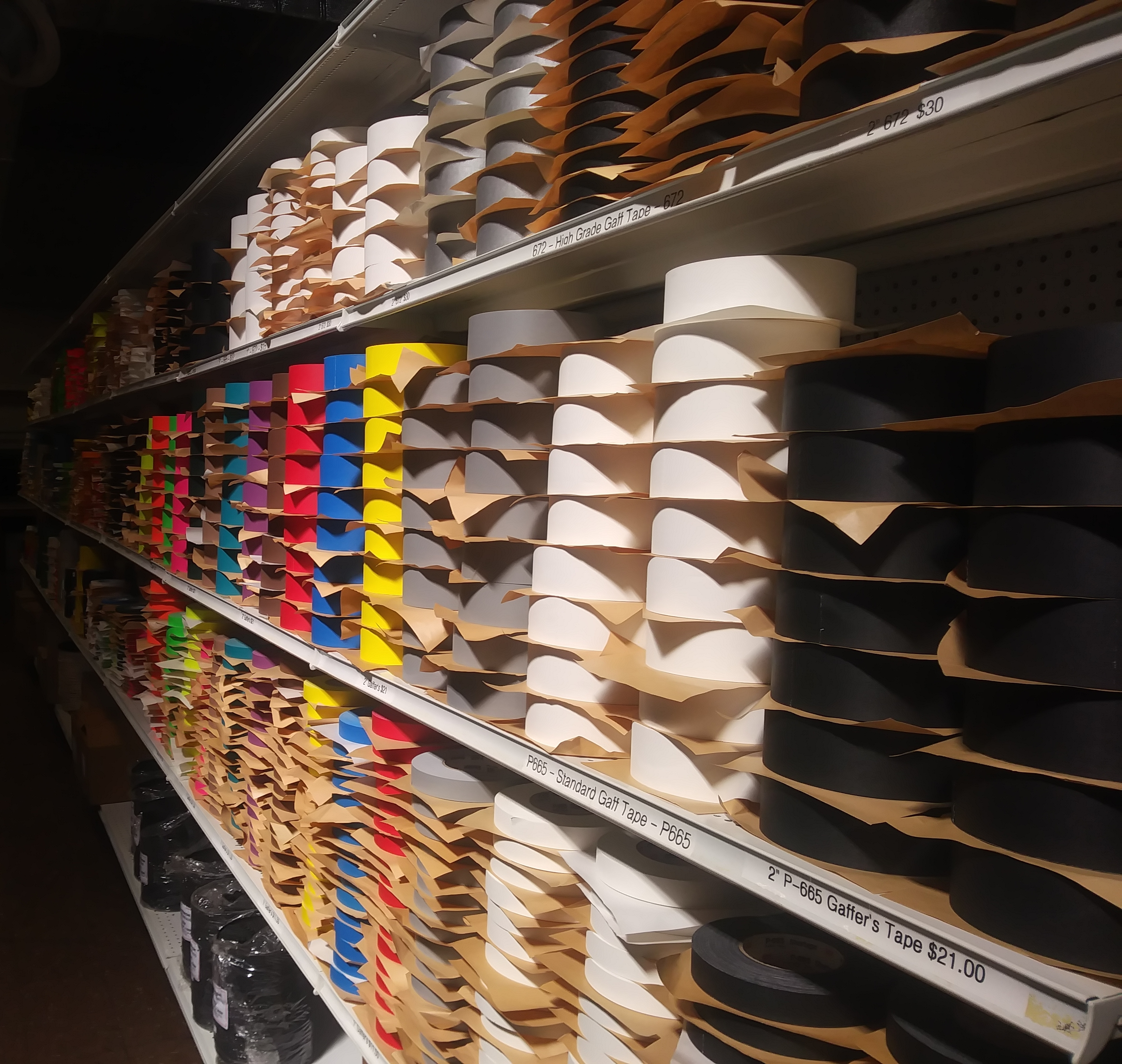
Rolls of gaffer tape in a variety of colors

A common application for gaffer tape is securing cables to a stage floor, podium, or other surface, either for safety or concealment. It is also frequently used whenever a quick ad hoc fix is required, from temporarily attaching fixtures or props, to salvaging a broken piece of production equipment. A narrow version of gaffer tape, called spike tape, is used in theater productions for floor layout.

In the absence of console tape or artist tape, live sound engineers or light board operators may use a strip of white gaffer tape along the bottom of a mixing board to label the channels or submasters used for a particular show.

In rock climbing gyms, gaffer tape can be used to mark climbs on the wall. It is preferable to duct tape because it is stronger and lasts longer on the wall.

== See also ==
- Best boy
- Dolly grip
- List of adhesive tapes
- Speed tape
- Theatrical technician
