= Speed tape =

Aluminum tape for vehicle repairs

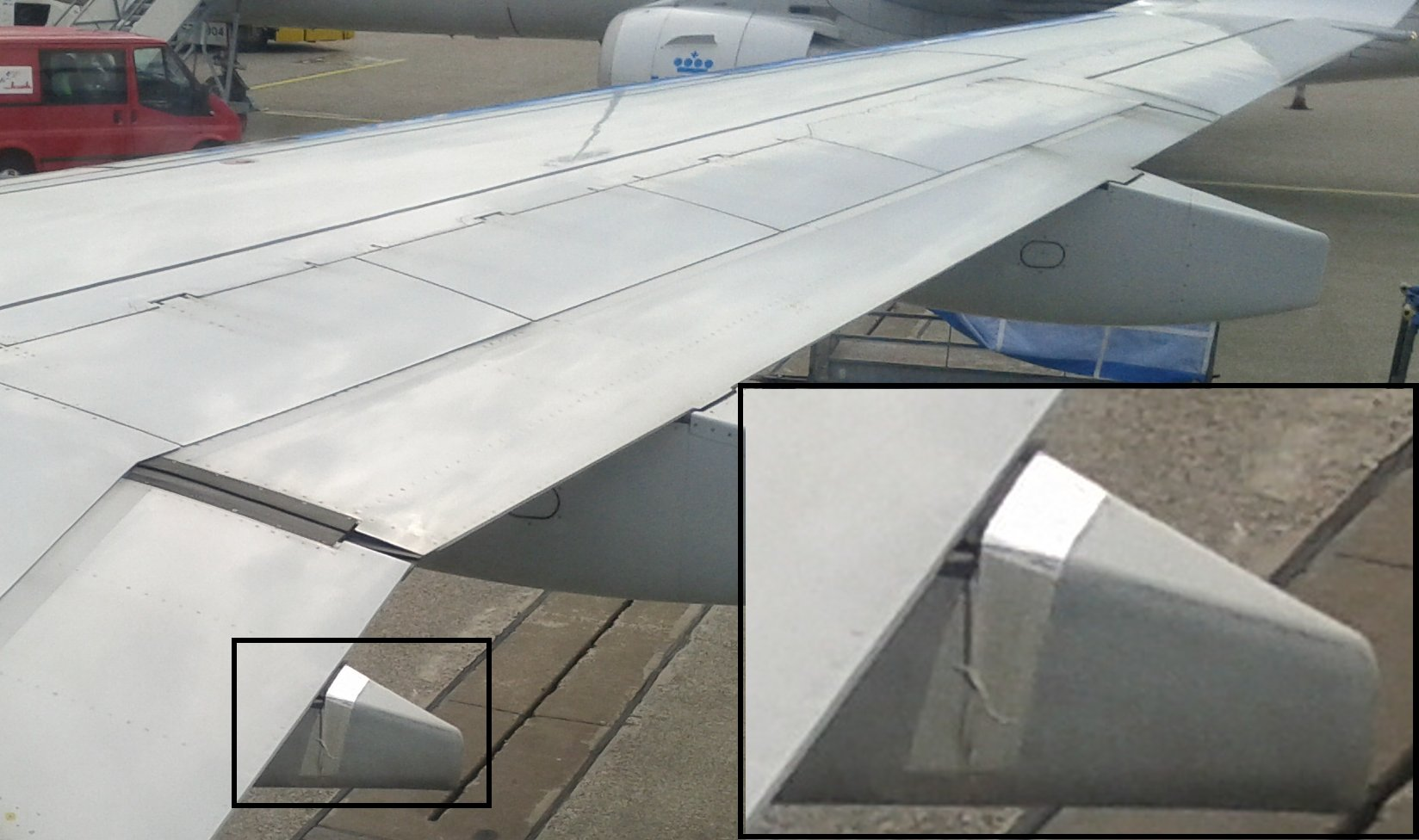
Photo of speed tape used to patch a crack

Speed tape is an aluminium pressure-sensitive tape used to perform minor repairs on aircraft and racing cars. It is used as a temporary repair material until a more permanent repair can be carried out. It has an appearance similar to duct tape, for which it is sometimes mistaken, but its adhesive is capable of sticking on an airplane fuselage or wing at high speeds, giving it the common name.

== History ==
Aluminum tape has been suggested for splicing wires, such as communications cables, since 1959. It was used for internal sound proofing in aircraft, such as the Convair 880, as early as 1960.

== Properties ==
Depending on the adhesive layer used, it can be resistant to water, solvents, and, for brief periods, flames, and will reflect heat and UV light. It is also able to expand and contract through a wide range of temperatures.

Speed tape may be formed of soft aluminium with an adhesive layer, or a multi-layer laminate including aluminium and cloth in addition to an adhesive layer.

== Use ==
Speed tape is sometimes used to protect sealant while curing, or to patch non-critical components of an aircraft. It can also be used for patching bullet damage to combat aircraft.

Typically, airlines avoid using speed tape on parts that are visible to passengers, so as not to cause concern, but its usage is unavoidable in some instances. In 2022 there were reports some Boeing 787 Dreamliner airplanes had issues with paint adhesion on their wings due to UV damage. The temporary solution recommended by Boeing was to apply speed tape to prevent paint peeling while the company was developing a permanent solution.

Use of speed tape should be authorized by engineering teams, and has to comply with certain requirements. Fines can be levied against airlines that use it to make improper repairs.

== Gallery ==
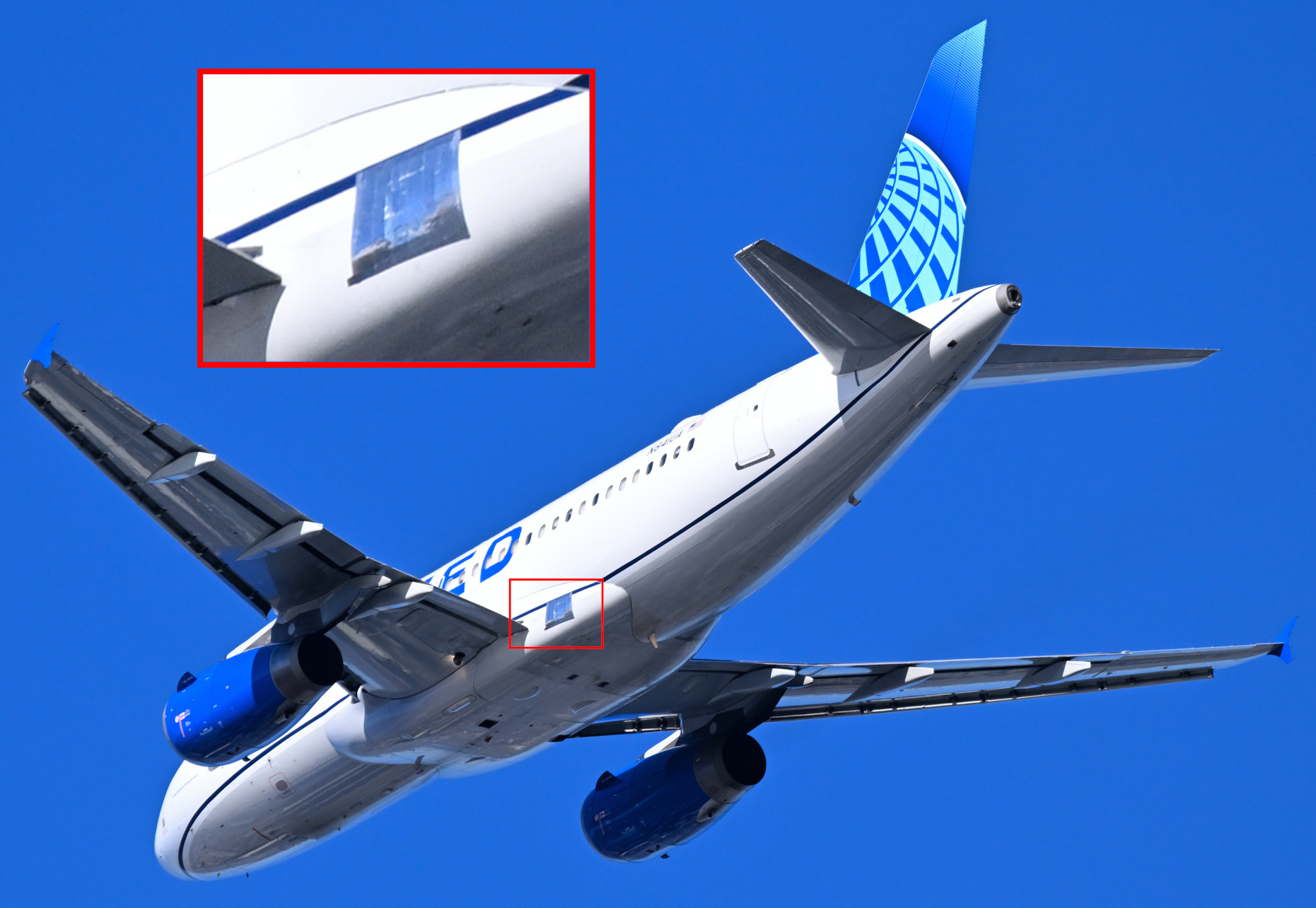
A patch of speed tape on a United Airlines Airbus A319

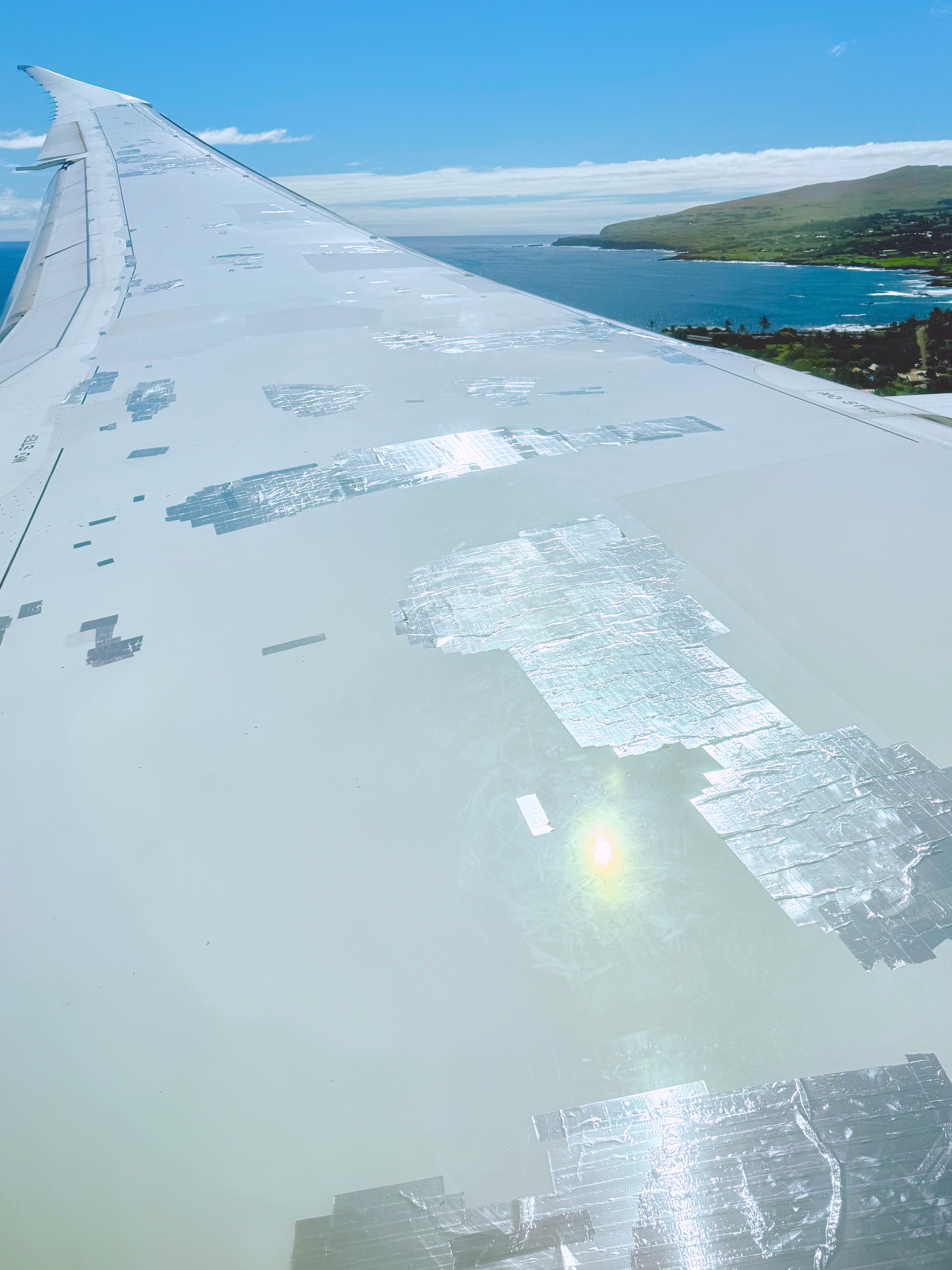
Several patches of speed tape on a Boeing 787 wing

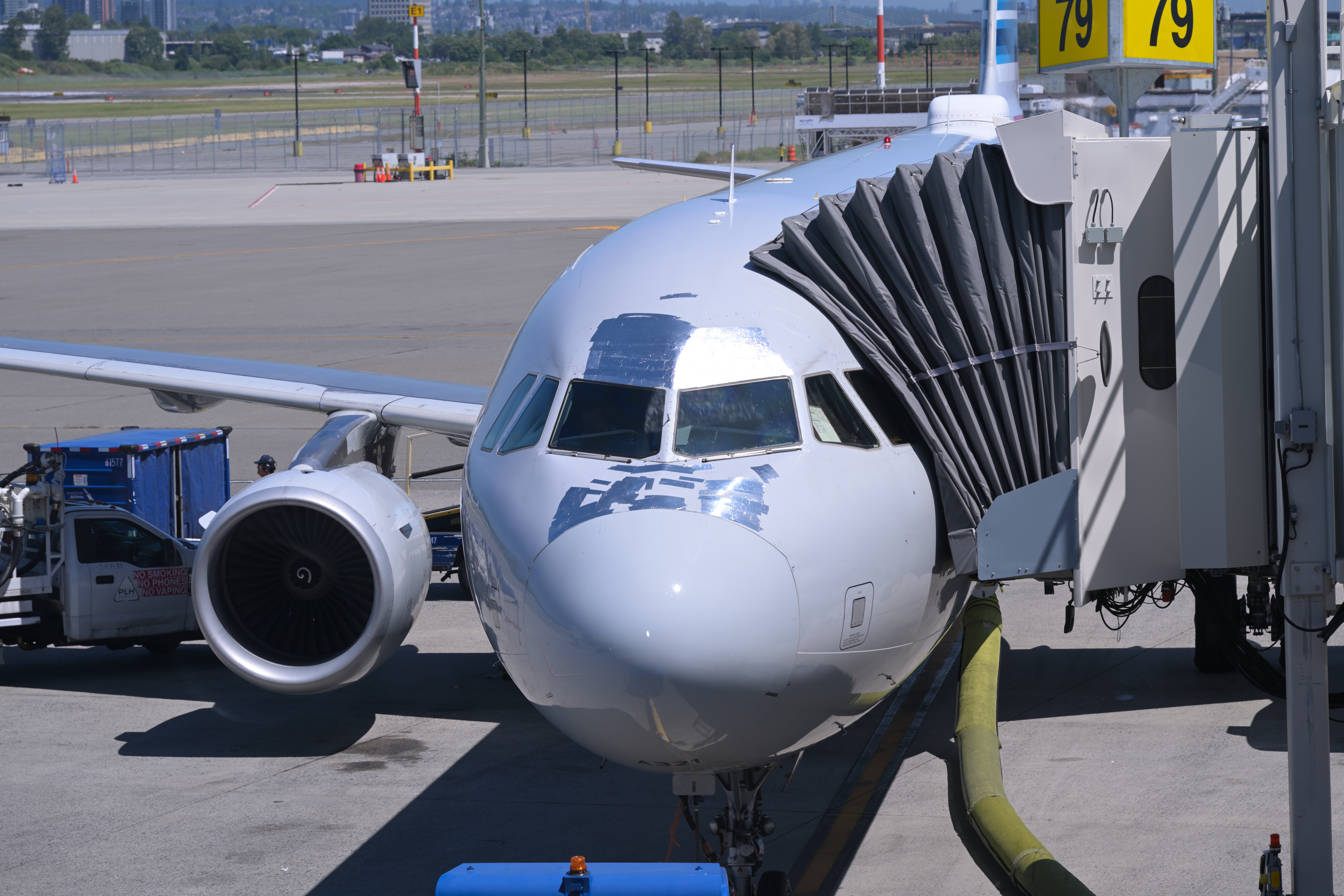
Several patches of speed tape on an American Airlines Airbus A321

== See also ==
- List of adhesive tapes
