= Lingerie tape =

Adhesive tape for the breast area

Lingerie tape, also known as cleavage tape, fashion tape, dress tape and tit tape, is a double-sided adhesive tape, used to secure the edges of a strapless dress or top to the cleavage or side of the breasts or on shoulders to secure bra straps from slipping, in order to keep the item of clothing in place and to avoid a wardrobe malfunction. It may also be referred to as toupee tape or wig tape, a similar double-sided tape intended for a different function (securing a hairpiece or merkin).

Some users, such as beauty pageant participants and transgender people, create cleavage by using tape underneath and across their breast, bending forward, tightly pulling them together and up. Types of tape used include surgical micropore tape and athletic tape. Some also use a strip of moleskin under the breasts with tape at the ends to hold it in place. Use of the wrong techniques or tape with too strong an adhesive can cause injuries such as rashes, blisters and skin being torn off.
