= Spike (stagecraft) =

Positional marking on the stage

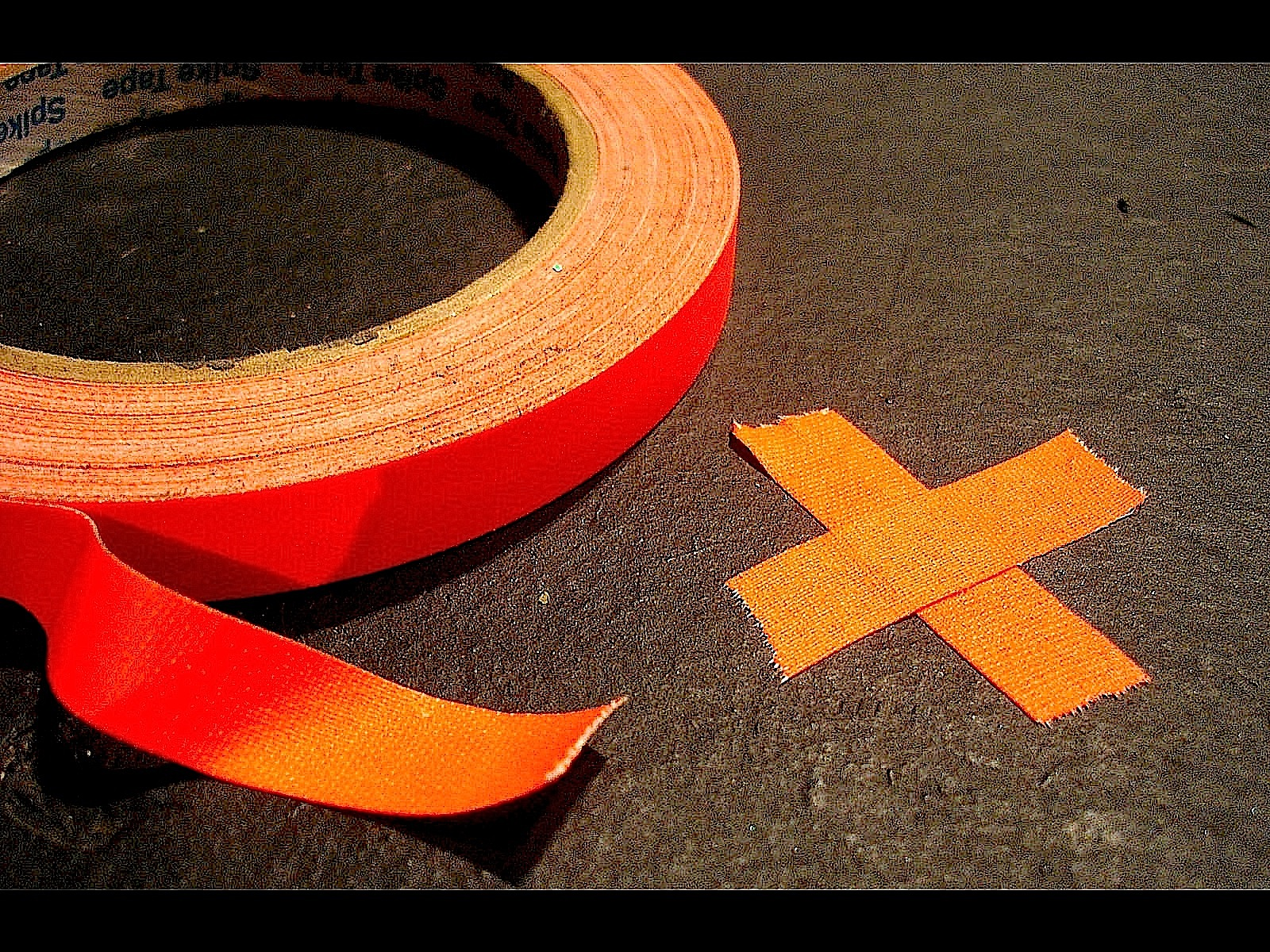
a roll of spike tape and an example of a stage marking, or a "spike."

In stagecraft, a spike is a marking, usually made with a piece of tape (although some theatres use paint pens), put on or around the stage. This marking is used to show the correct position for set pieces, furniture, actors and other items which move during the course of a performance and are required to stop or be placed in a specific location.

Several companies make rolls of very thin gaffer's or paper tape marketed as "spike tape" specifically for placing spikes. In a pinch, gaffer, masking or electrical tape can be used. When used to indicate locations under dark conditions, phosphorescent tape (sometimes referred to as "glow tape") is used for practical and safety reasons. Performer spikes are generally only used when positioning needs to be precise, either for safety or performance reasons, such as lighting specials.

== Placement ==
During a theatrical technical rehearsal one of the stage management team will be ready to mark positions as required. To enable spike placement to be done quickly, staff may pre-cut small strips of tape either by scoring tape still on the roll or by cutting strips of tape and placing them onto a small piece of wood or clipboard called a spike board. When spiking a position for a performer, a small cross is typically used. For furniture pieces and scenery wagons, the marks are usually two pieces of tape laid in an "L" shape at two points or corners of the item. Usually this will be the up-stage side to minimize the visual impact for the audience. In larger productions the stage manager will typically use different coloured spikes to differentiate the positions of various items and performers. Depending on the performance, writing will be placed on the spike to indicate what items are being marked, and in which Act and Scene the spike is used.

In film and television, a generic "X" spike for performers is typically replaced with a "T" mark, where the performers' toes are placed on the horizontal bar and the vertical bar is between their feet. This mark is most commonly used to spike "stop points" allowing performers to travel around a set and stop in the correct position and orientation to be in focus for the cameras. Correctly stopping on a mark, without glancing down, is what entertainment professionals are referring to when they use the common phrase "hit the mark". (For various reasons beyond the scope of this article, the lenses in professional cameras are manually focused by focus pullers and do not use autofocus, meaning that performers who fail to hit their marks will be out of focus in the resulting shots.)

The placement of spikes in film and television is typically the responsibility of a camera assistant (North America) or grip (Europe).

Spike tape is a cotton cloth tape used to create temporary markings on stages and theatrical sets.

== Spike tape ==
Spike tape is used to create a stage marking called a spike. Good quality gaffers tape uses a synthetic rubber adhesive that does not leave a residue when removed from the stage. Spike tape's narrow width means that it can be quickly torn by hand, and its tight weave of cotton fibers allows for straight tearing without stretching. In addition to creating spike marks in performance areas, spike tape also makes a good material for bundling, decorating and labeling.

Spike tape may also be fluorescent (in which case it is made of plastic or vinyl rather than cotton) so that it can be easily seen by the running crews moving set pieces during a dark scene change. This is usually referred to as "glow tape" or "glo-tape". Glow tape is notoriously less sticky than spike tape and may be additionally held down to the stage floor, or "deck", with the aid of staples. Note, however, that in some situations even ordinary spike tape may need to be covered with clear packing tape to keep it from being accidentally pulled up. In some cases it may be preferred to use clear vinyl tape, such as the type used to splice dance flooring, to protect spike marks as it is more easily removed from stage surfaces and does not leave an adhesive residue. Sometimes roofing nails can be used to create unobtrusive spike marks.

=== Specialized spike tape products ===
Spike tape "corners" are die-cut 90° L-shaped spike pieces that are especially helpful for placement of wagons, flats and furniture pieces.

== See also ==
- List of adhesive tapes
