= Tape dispenser =

Object

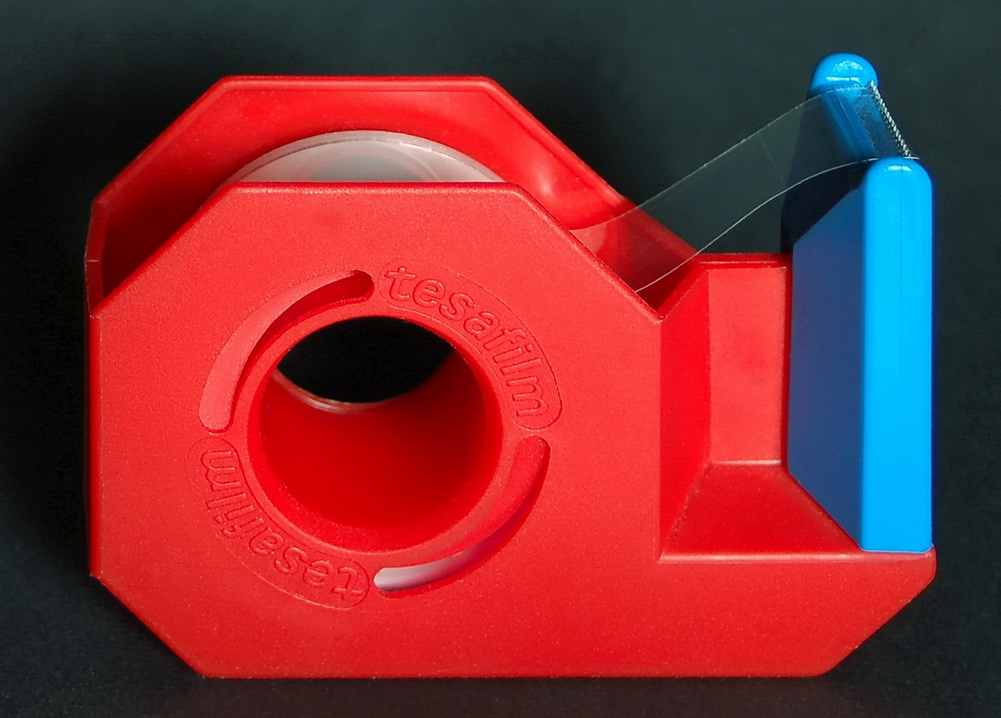
A small tape dispenser

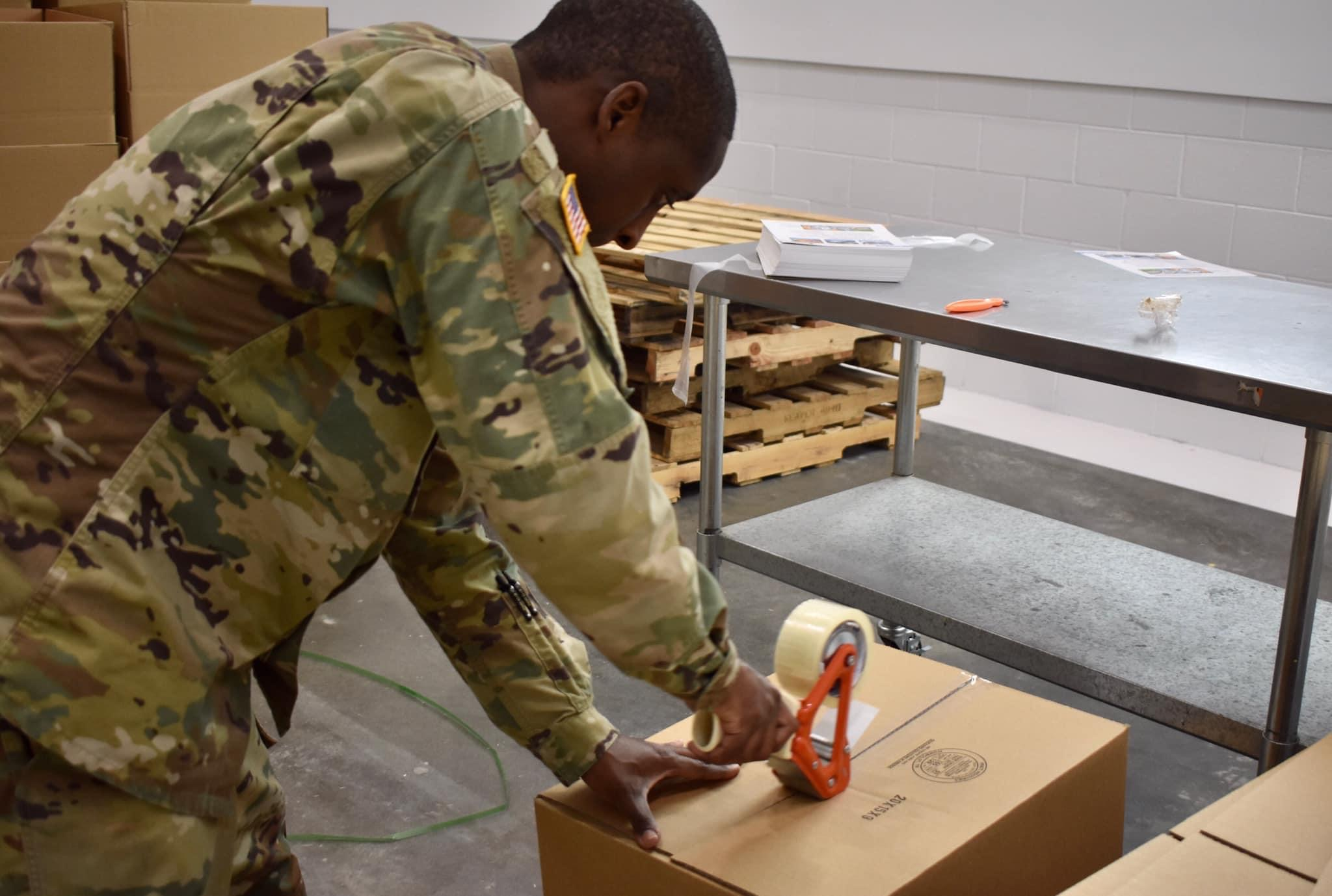
box sealing tape being applied with a roll-on tape dispenser

A tape dispenser is an object that holds a roll of tape and has a mechanism at one end to shear the tape. Dispensers vary widely based on the tape they dispense. Abundant and most common, clear tape dispensers (like those used in an office or at home) are commonly made of plastic, and may be disposable. Other dispensers are stationary and may have sophisticated features to control tape usage and improve ergonomics.

== History ==
Prior to the development of the tape dispenser, 3M's standard clear scotch tape was sold as a roll, and had to be carefully peeled from the end and cut with scissors. To make the product more useful, the scotch tape sales manager at 3M, John Borden, designed the first tape dispenser in 1932, which had a built-in cutting mechanism and would hold the cut end of the tape until its next use.

== Handheld dispenser ==
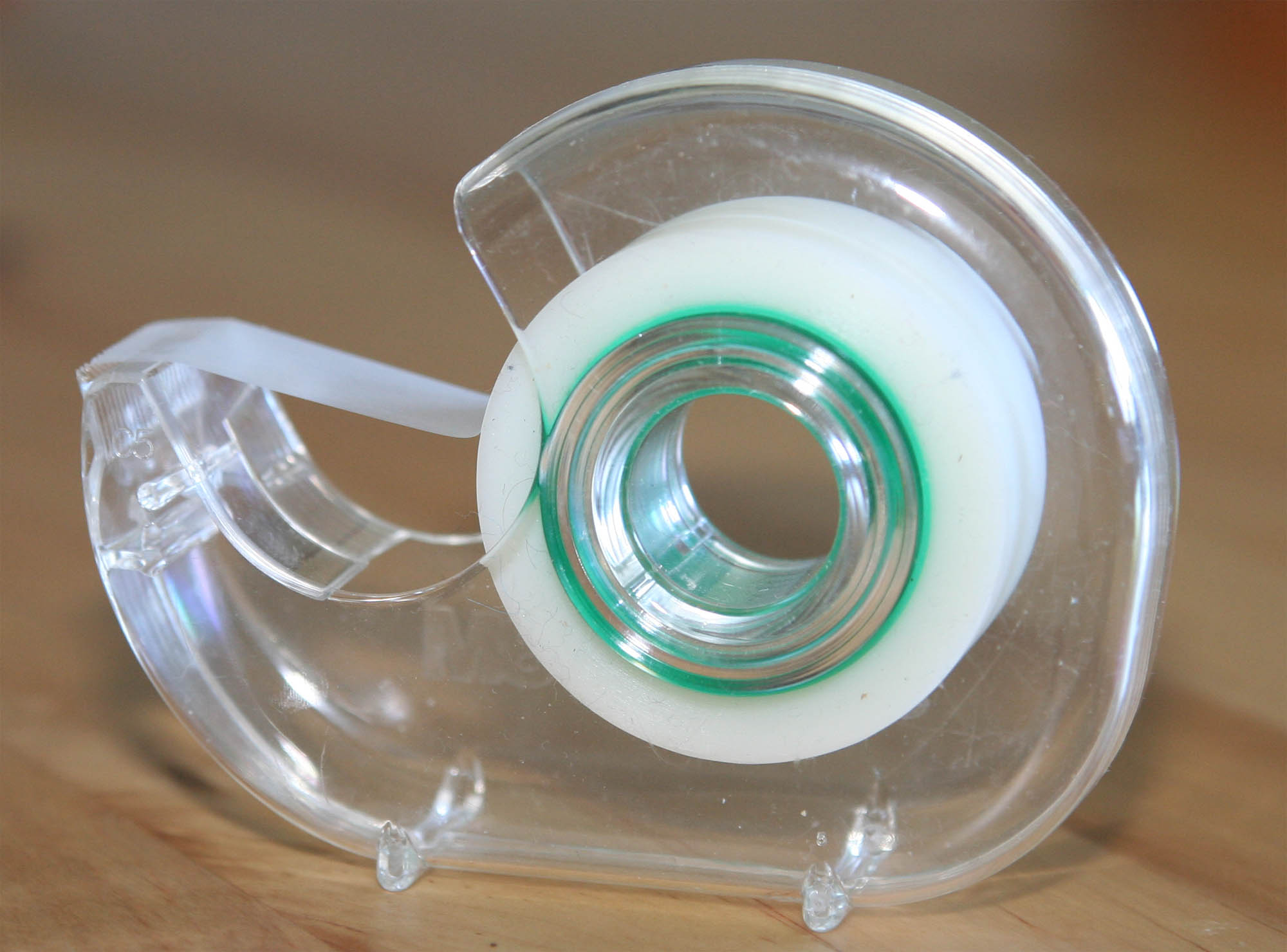
A clear case tape dispenser

A tape gun

A handheld dispenser, roll-on tape dispenser, or "tape gun" is a variation of handheld tape dispenser used to apply tape.

Some dispensers are small enough so that the dispenser, with the tape in it, can be taken to the point of application for operator ease. The dispenser allows for a convenient cut-off and helps the operator apply (and sometimes helps rub down) the tape.

== Tabletop dispensers ==
=== Pull-and-tear ===
Tabletop or desk dispensers are frequently used to hold the tape and allow the operator to pull off the desired amount, tear the tape off, and take the tape to the job.

=== Stationary electronic tape dispenser ===
Tabletop dispensers are available with electrical assists to dispense and cut pressure-sensitive tape to a predetermined length. They are often used in an industrial setting to increase productivity along manufacturing or assembly lines. They eliminate the need to manually measure and cut each individual piece of tape on high volumes of product or packaging. By automating this process, automatic tape dispensers reduce material waste caused by human error. They also reduce the time needed to cut each piece of tape, therefore reducing labor costs and increasing productivity.

== Automated equipment ==
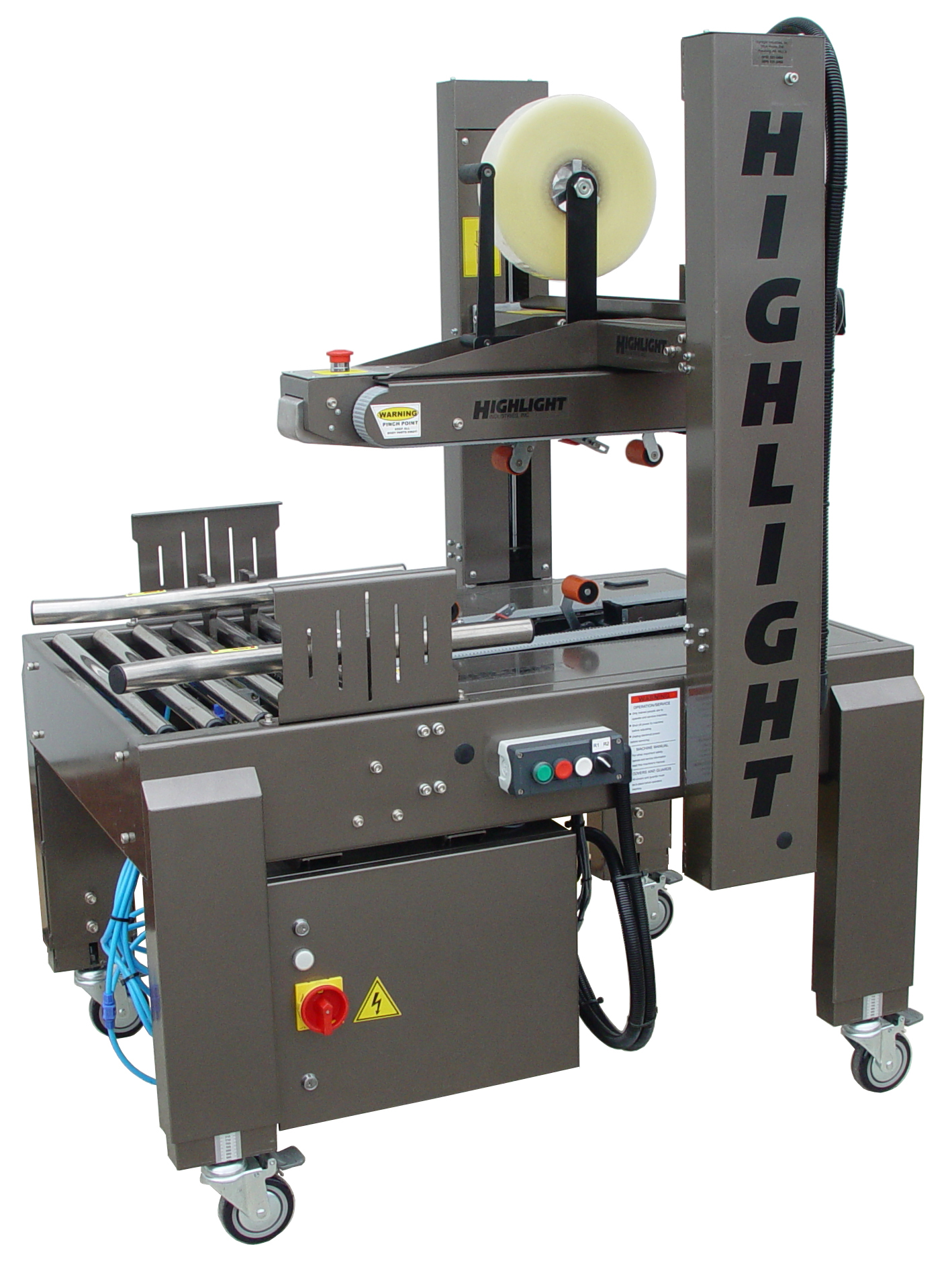
A semi-automatic box sealing machine.

Some taping machinery is semi-automatic: the operator takes an object and puts it in or through a machine which automatically applies the tape. This helps save time and controls the consumption of tape.

Fully automatic equipment is available which does not require an operator. All functions can be automated.

High speed packaging machinery is an example of highly automated equipment.

== Gummed (water-activated) tape dispenser ==
Gummed (water activated) tape dispensers measure, dispense, moisten, and cut gummed or water-activated adhesive tape. This tape is often composed of a paper backing and adhesive glue that is unable to adhere until it is "activated" by contact with water. To perform this step, gummed dispensers often employ a water bottle and wetting brush to moisten each piece of tape as it is dispensed. Many gummed dispensers feature a heater, which is mounted over the feed area to maintain the dispenser's water temperature. These heaters ensure maximum wetting, and are ideal in cold climates. Gummed tape dispensers are often used in packaging or shipping departments for closing corrugated boxes.

== See also ==
- Tape Wrangler
