= Surgical tape =

Pressure-sensitive adhesive tape

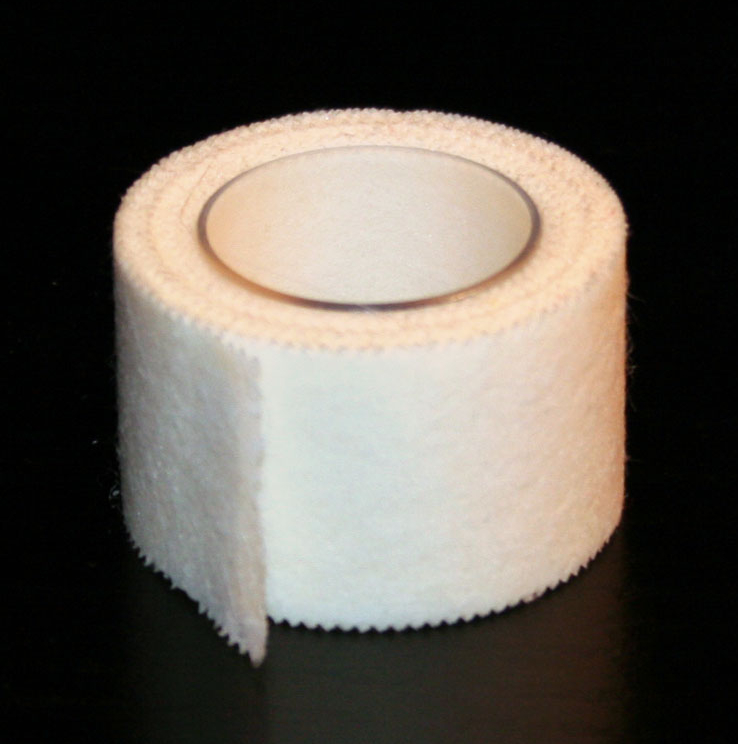
Albupore surgical tape, similar to Micropore

Surgical tape or medical tape is a type of pressure-sensitive adhesive tape used in medicine and first aid to hold a bandage or other dressing onto a wound. These tapes usually have a hypoallergenic adhesive which is designed to hold firmly onto skin, dressing materials, and underlying layers of tape, but to remove easily without damaging the skin. They allow air to reach the skin ("breathable"). Some breathable tapes such as kinesiology tape, and other elastic bandages with adhesive are made of cotton. Surgical tape is often white because it contains zinc oxide, which is added to help prevent infections. Tapes made of porous material, such as 3M Micropore, are widely used.

== History ==
Primitive surgical tape, or sparadrapum probably consisted of strips of cloth impregnated with some type of plaster or sticky gum, which was applied over gauzes or wound dressings to hold them in place. Plaster casts over fractures were sometimes called "Spanish dressings"

In the Middle Ages an Italian description appears in the thirteenth century, where surgical tape was recorded as sparadrappo, although there were some variations of spelling. In French it first appears in 1314 as speradrapu, and in Spanish it was documented as espadrapo around 1495.

Linguistically it is possible that in European Romance languages:

- the first linguistic element spara could come Latin separāre (separate), itself composed verb parāre (prepare, arrange), and linked to a root Indo-European per (Ə) -1 (procure, disposal).
- The second element comes from Latin 'drappus (cloth or rag), and appears in the fifth century BC work of the Greek medical writer Oribasius, who speculates that term may relate to a Celtic loan word.

== Types of surgical tape ==
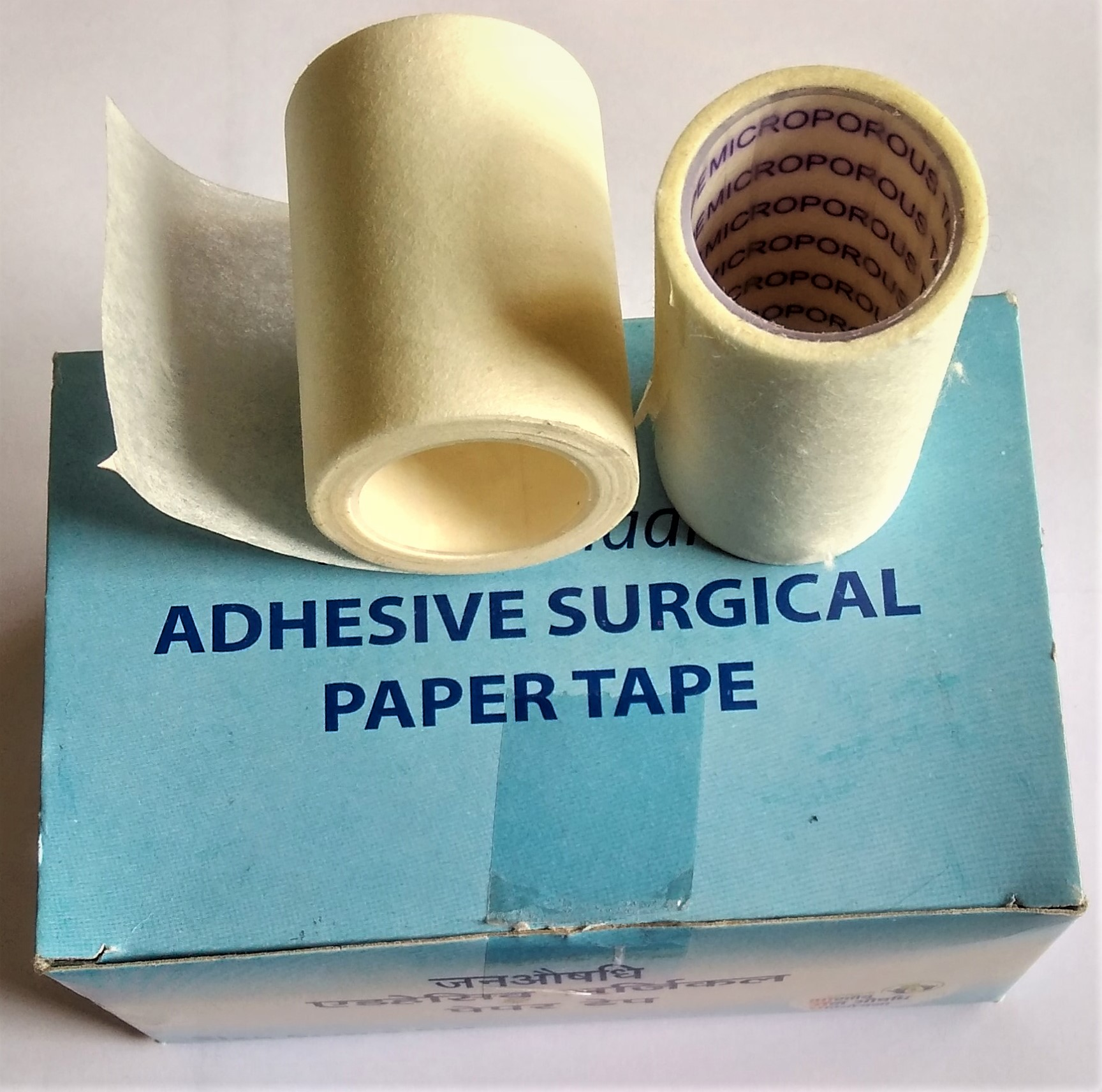
Adhesive surgical paper tape

There are many types of surgical tape classified according to the material of which the tape itself is constituted and the qualities of the applied adhesive, which should be hypoallergenic.

The most common types are either fragile tape (such as paper, which tears easily) or tear-resistant (often fabric or plastic) and some of these may also be either waterproof or breathable or both water-resistant and partly-porous, allowing some limited passage of air and moisture. A bandage should have appropriate adhesive power and be breathable and at the same time impermeable, easy to remove without irritating the skin and resistant to extreme temperatures, aging and solar radiation. Surgical tapes for medical use are subject to the requirements contained in internationally recognized standards such as the ASTM International ASTM PSTC / 6 standard.

== Features ==
Some features of surgical tape dressings include:

- rolls, or pre-cut and individually packaged
- transparent, white, and "skin" colours (although in a limited range of skin colours)
- rigid, or stretch (to fix a dressing in place, or to flex around to skeletal joints)
- waterproof or absorbent
