= Electrical tape =

Adhesive electrical insulation

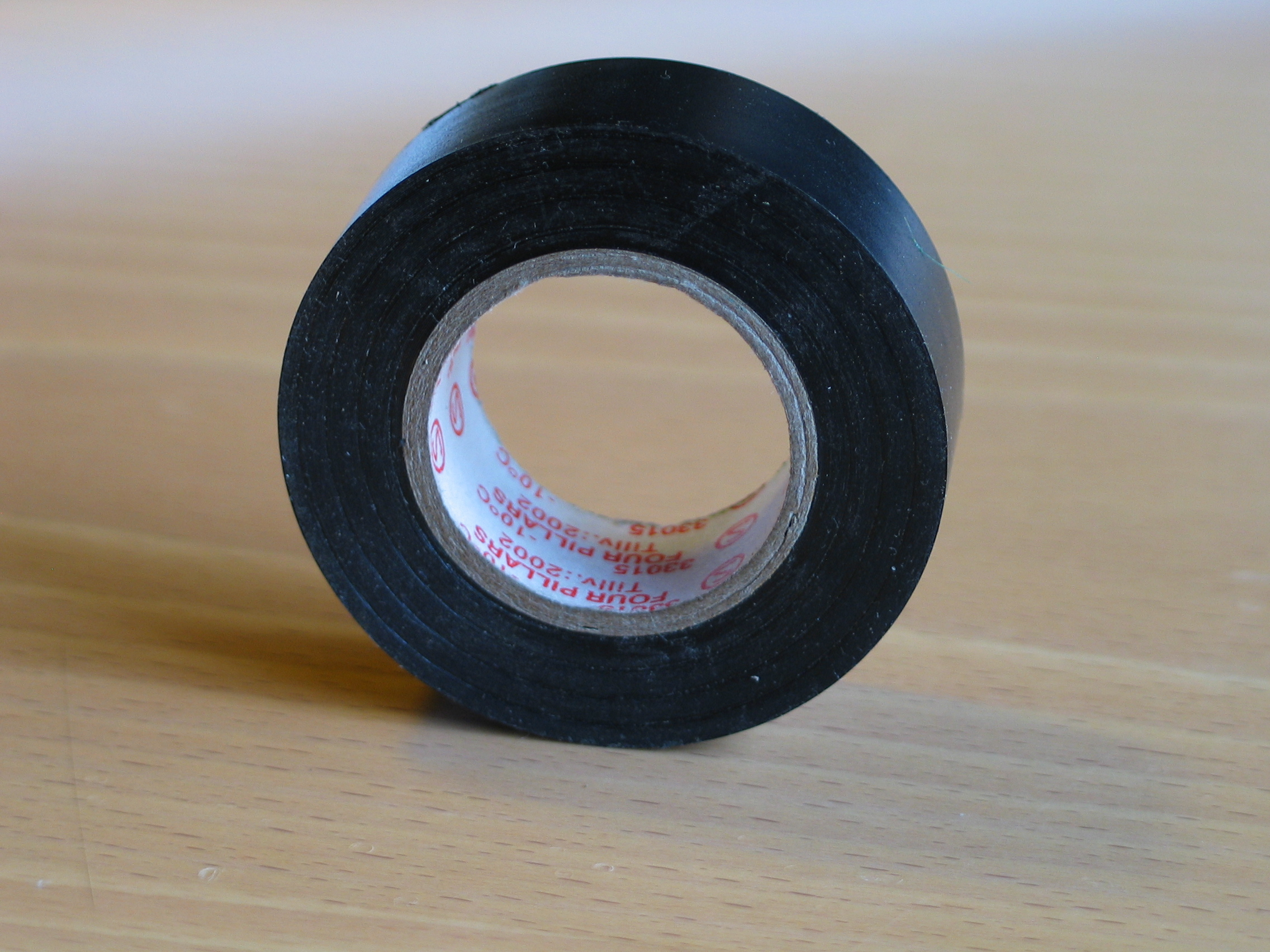
Electrical tape, standard black

Electrical tape (or insulating tape) is a type of pressure-sensitive tape used to insulate electrical wires and other materials that conduct electricity. It can be made of many plastics but PVC (polyvinyl chloride, "vinyl") is the most popular, as it stretches well and gives effective and long-lasting insulation. Electrical tape for class H insulation is made of fiberglass cloth.

== Varieties ==
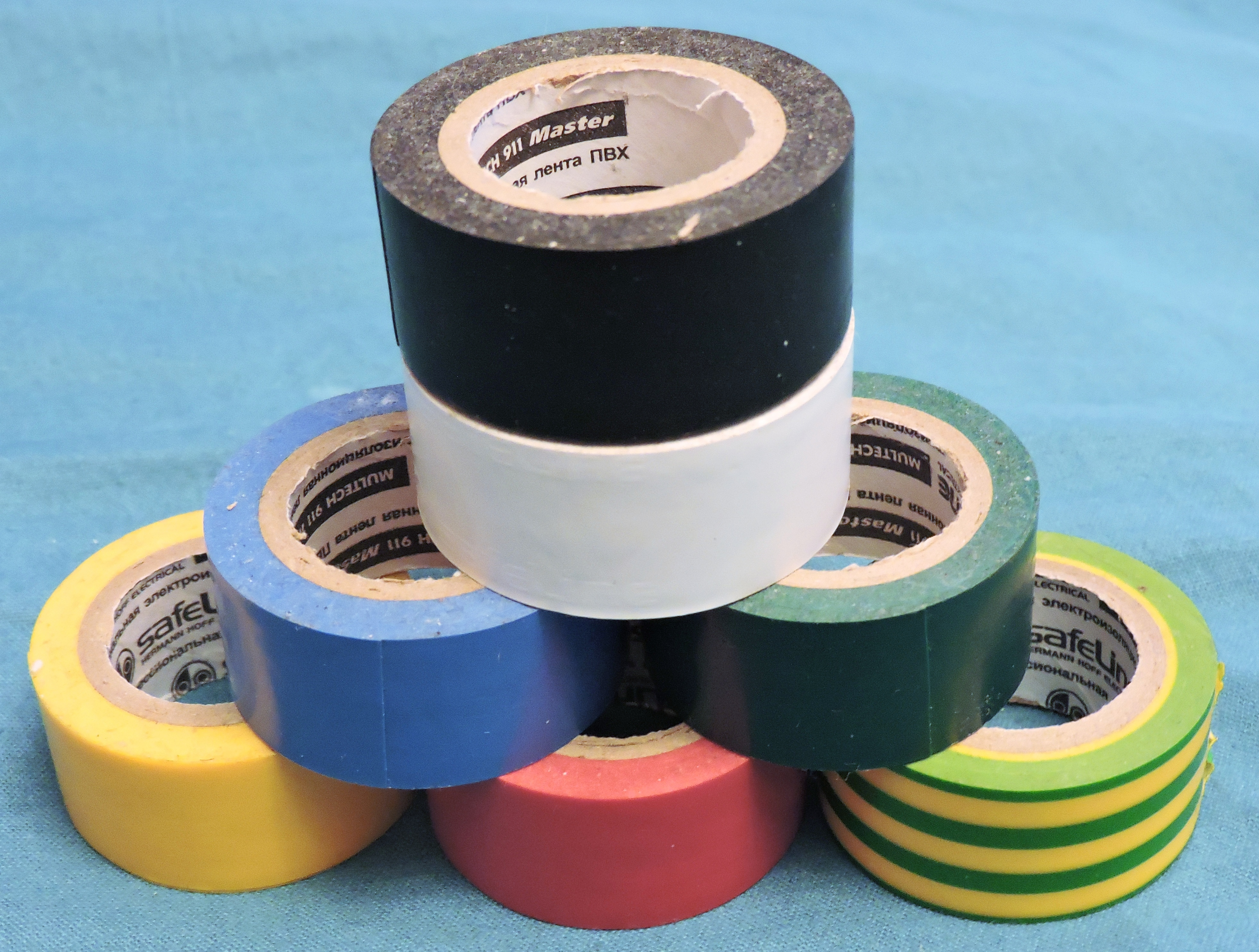
A selection of color-coded electrical tapes.

A wide variety of electrical tapes are available, some for highly specialized purposes. The primary tapes used in electrical applications are vinyl, rubber, mastic, and varnished cambric. Electricians may use various colors of tape to insulate wire and to indicate the voltage level and phase of the wire (colored tape sometimes is called "phasing tape"). When wires are phased, a ring of tape is placed on each end near the termination so that the purpose of the wire is obvious. The following table(s) describe the use of electrical tape.

Electrical tape color codes
Tape color	Usage (U.S.)	Usage (U.K.)	Usage (International – new)
Black	Insulation; Low voltage, phase A	Insulation; Low voltage, phase C	Low voltage, phase B
Red	Low voltage, phase B	Low voltage, phase A	Sheath, 415 V 3 phase
Blue	Low voltage, phase C	Low voltage, phase C	Low voltage, neutral Sheath, 230 V
Brown	High voltage, phase A	Low voltage, phase A	Low voltage, phase A
Orange	High voltage, phase B		Sheath, garden tools
Yellow	High voltage, phase C	Low voltage, phase B	Sheath, 110 V site wiring
Green	Earth ground	Earth	
Green with yellow stripe	Isolated ground	Earth ground	Earth
White	Low voltage, neutral		
Gray	High voltage, neutral		Low voltage, phase C

Tape that is approved for electrical applications will carry an approval label from an accreditation agency.

== History ==
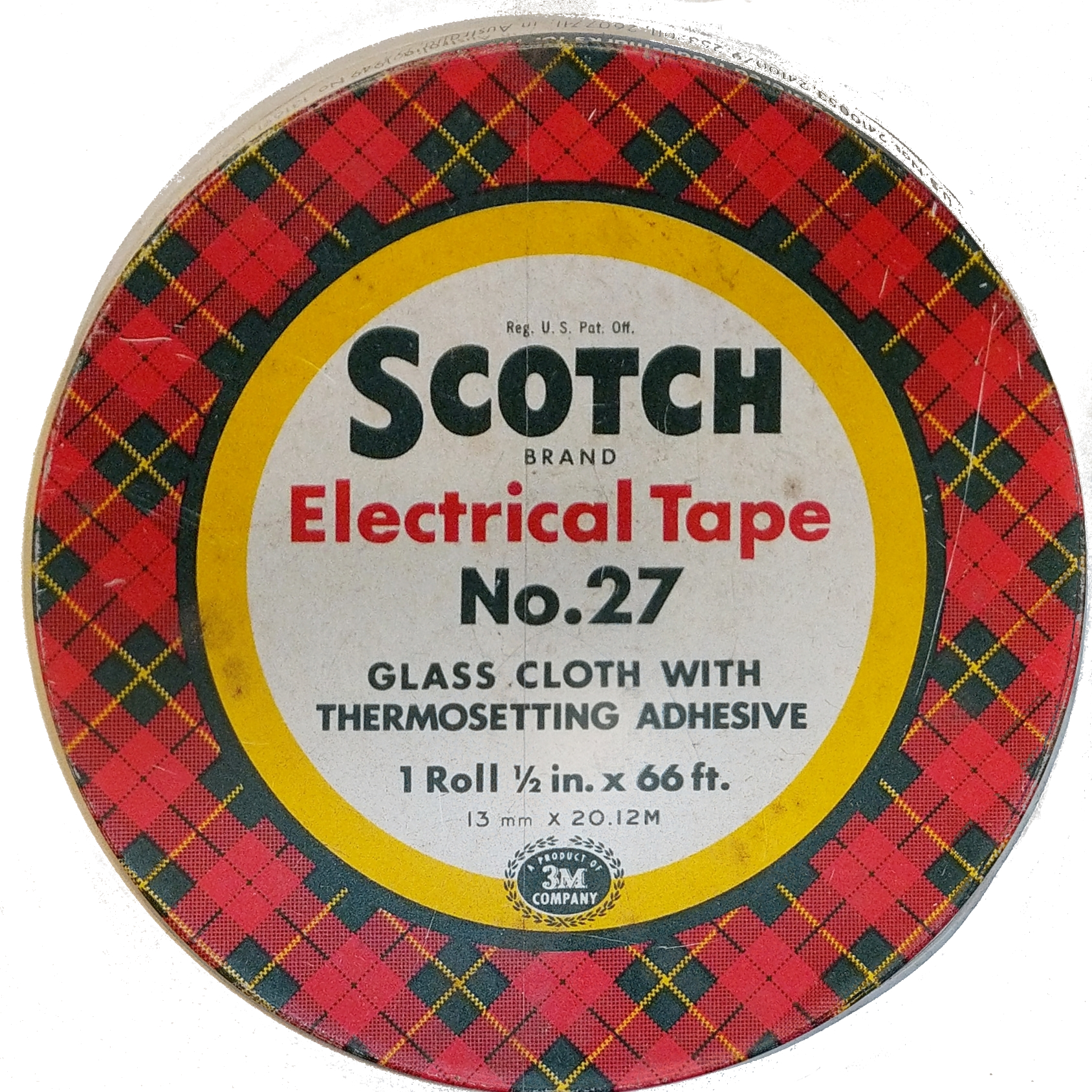
Electrical tape #27

The original electrical insulating tape was made of cloth tape impregnated with Chatterton's compound, an adhesive material manufactured using gutta-percha. This type of tape was often used to insulate soldered splices on knob and tube wiring. It was commonly referred to as "friction tape", and had the unique property of being sticky on both sides. Because of this, no matter how it was used it stuck to itself very readily.

In the early 1940s, vinyl plastic emerged as a versatile material for a wide range of applications, from shower curtains to cable insulation. A major ingredient in vinyl film was tricresyl phosphate (TCP), which was used as a plasticizer. Unfortunately, TCP tended to migrate, giving the surface of the vinyl film an oily quality and degrading every tape adhesive known. Research chemists and engineers at 3M set out to create a dependable, pressure-sensitive tape made of a vinyl film that would have the required electrical, physical and chemical properties.

Experiments were conducted by combining new plasticizers with the white, flour-like vinyl resin. In January 1946, inventors Snell, Oace, and Eastwold of 3M applied for a patent for a vinyl electrical tape with a plasticizer system and non-sulfur-based rubber adhesive that were compatible. The first commercially available version of the tape was sold for use as a wire-harness wrapping. This original electrical tape was not black. Tapes formulated for high-temperature were yellow, and later versions were white. Electrically insulating tapes are essential for enhancing functionality and reliability in a wide range of applications. Some of the most popular types include electrically insulating adhesive tape and electrically insulating film, both of which provide reliable electronic isolation and ensure that a direct electrical connection is not made between two or more circuits or their adjacent parts. There is also electrically conducting tape for shielding and similar applications. White tape, because of its instability in ultraviolet light, was eventually replaced with black tape, although colored vinyl tapes are still used as identification and marking tapes. Black became the standard industry color for vinyl standard tape, primarily because of its ultraviolet resistance. Thicknesses originally were 4 mil (100 μm), 8 mil (200 μm) and 12 mil (300 μm). These were standardized to 7 mil (180 μm) and 10 mil (250 μm) in 1948.

== See also ==
- List of adhesive tapes
- Friction tape
