= Adhesive tape =

Strip of material backed with adhesive

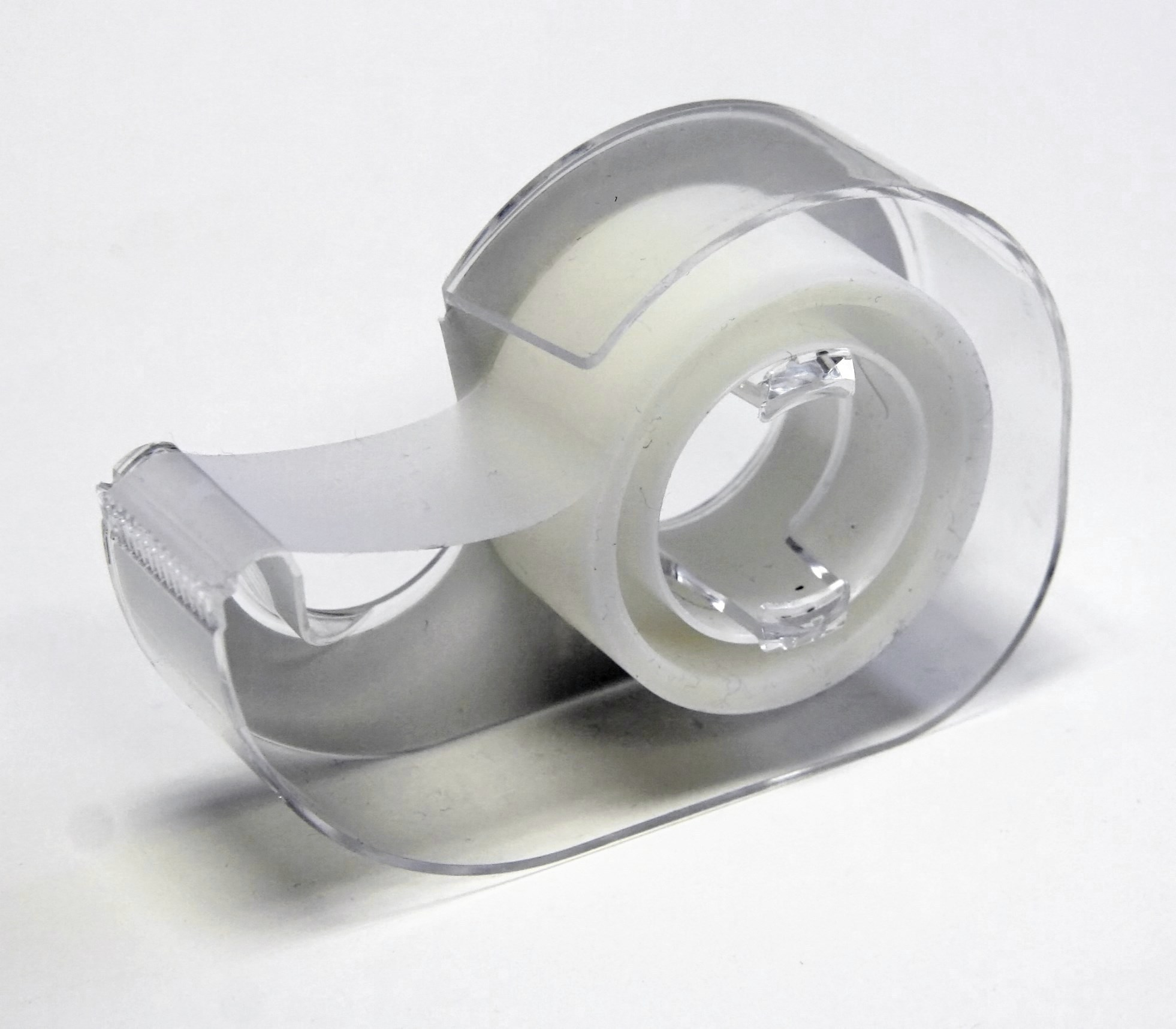
A roll of adhesive tape in a dispenser

Adhesive tape is one of many varieties of backing materials coated with an adhesive. Several types of adhesives can be used.

== History ==
The first records of adhesive tapes are found between 2500 and 3000 BCE (Old Kingdom) in Ancient Egypt. In wound treatment, the lips of the wound would be brought together by adhesive tape or stitching. The use of adhesive tape has been documented in the Edwin Smith Papyrus, and is believed to be based on early observations of the earliest known physician, Imhotep.

== Types ==
=== Pressure-sensitive adhesive tape ===
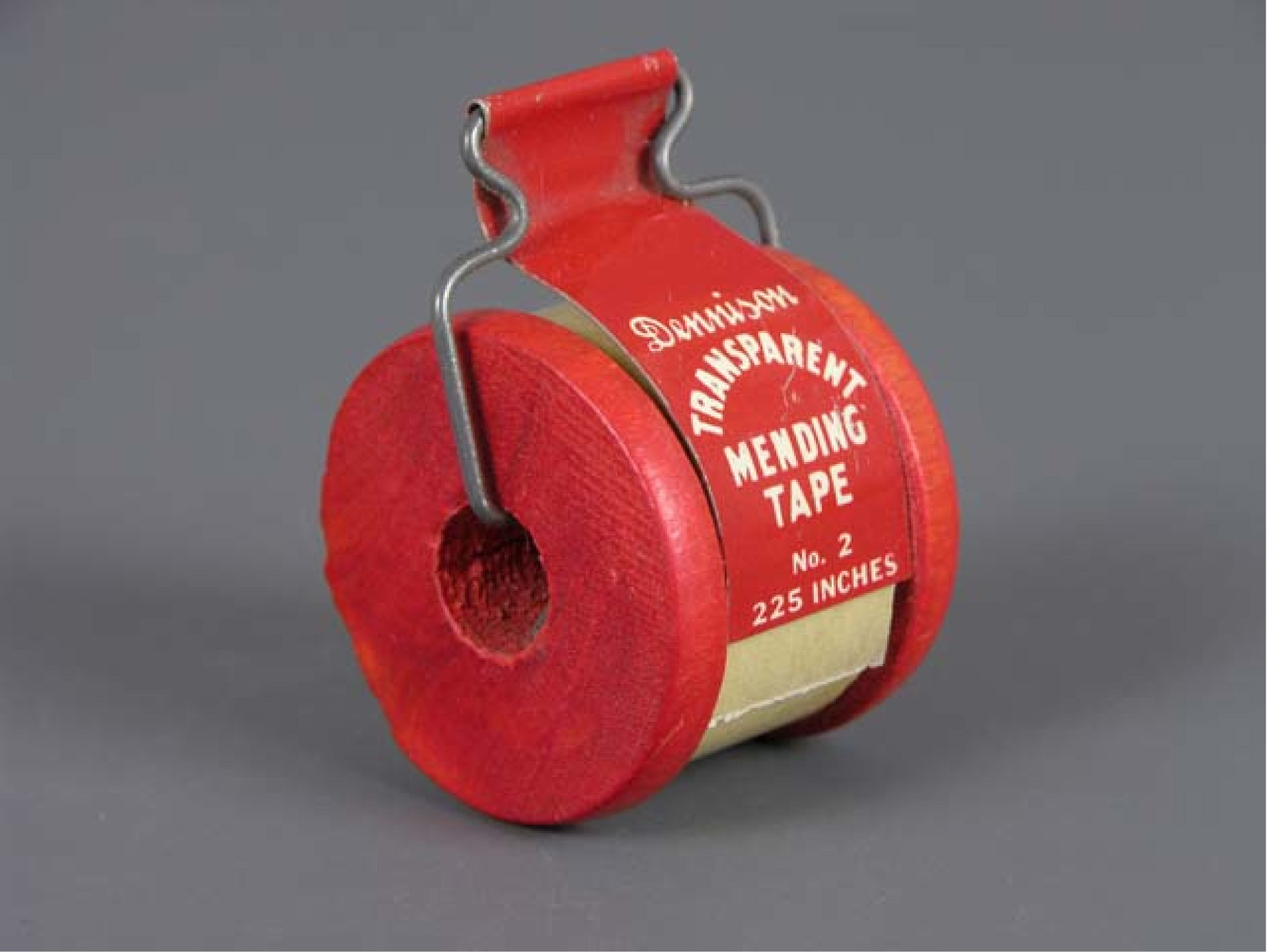
Dennison Mending Tape from the second half of the 20th century. From the Museo del Objeto del Objeto collection

Pressure-sensitive adhesive tape (PSA), also known as self-adhesive tape, self-stick adhesive tape or sticky tape, is a thin and flexible material consisting of a pressure sensitive adhesive coating onto a backing material such as paper, plastic film, cloth, or metal foil. It is sticky (tacky) without any heat or solvent for activation and adheres to surfaces with light pressure. Typical adhesives are polymers such as acrylics, silicone, polyester and rubber. These tapes usually require a release agent on their backing or a release liner to protect the adhesive during storage and manufacturing.

=== Water-activated tape ===
Water-activated tape, gummed paper tape or gummed tape is starch- or sometimes animal glue-based adhesive on a paper backing which becomes sticky when moistened.

A specific type of gummed tape is called reinforced gummed tape (RGT). The backing of this reinforced tape consists of two layers of paper with a cross-pattern of fiberglass filaments laminated between. The laminating adhesive had previously been asphalt but now is more commonly a hot-melt atactic polypropylene.

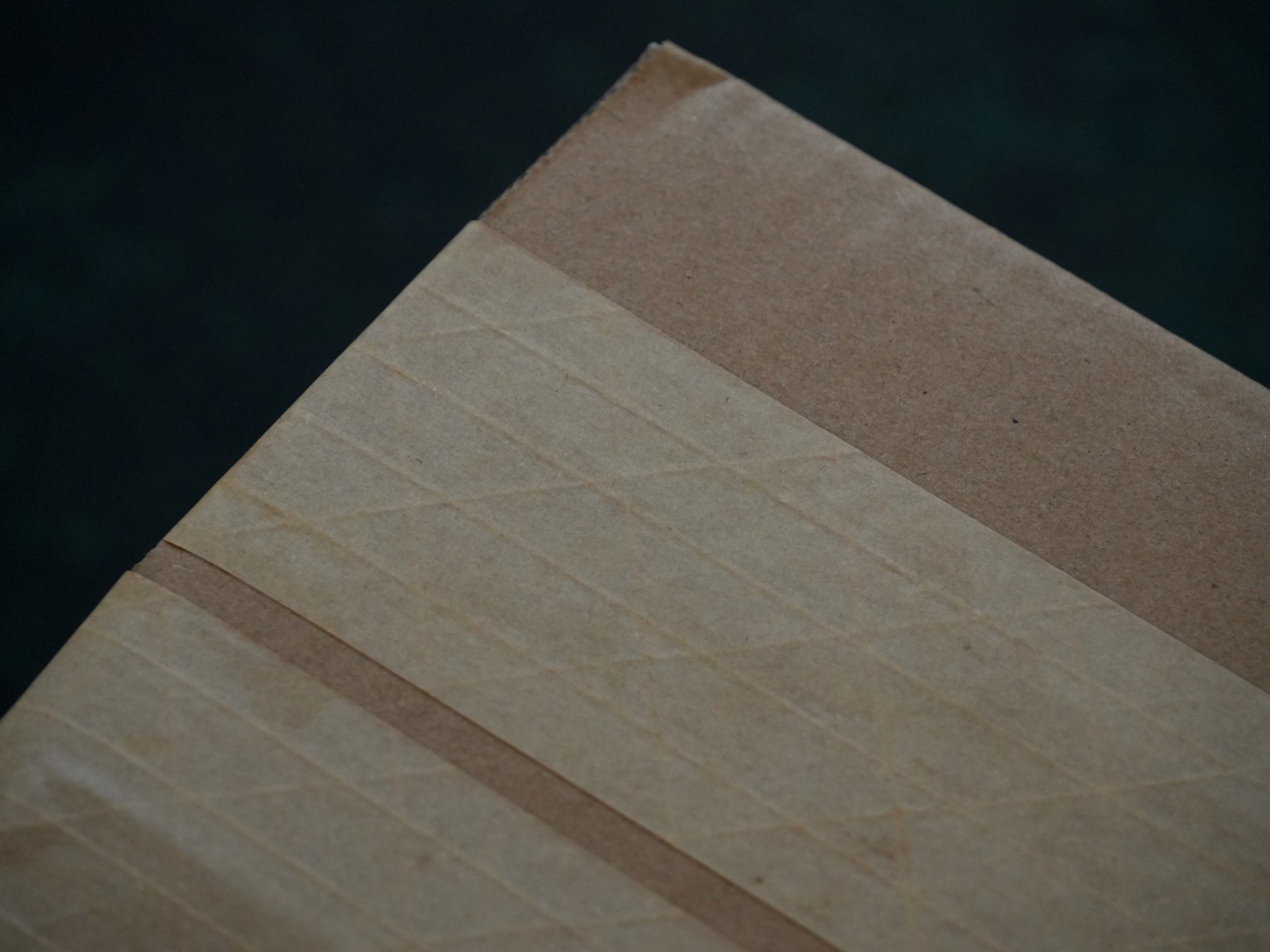
paper tape seal box application

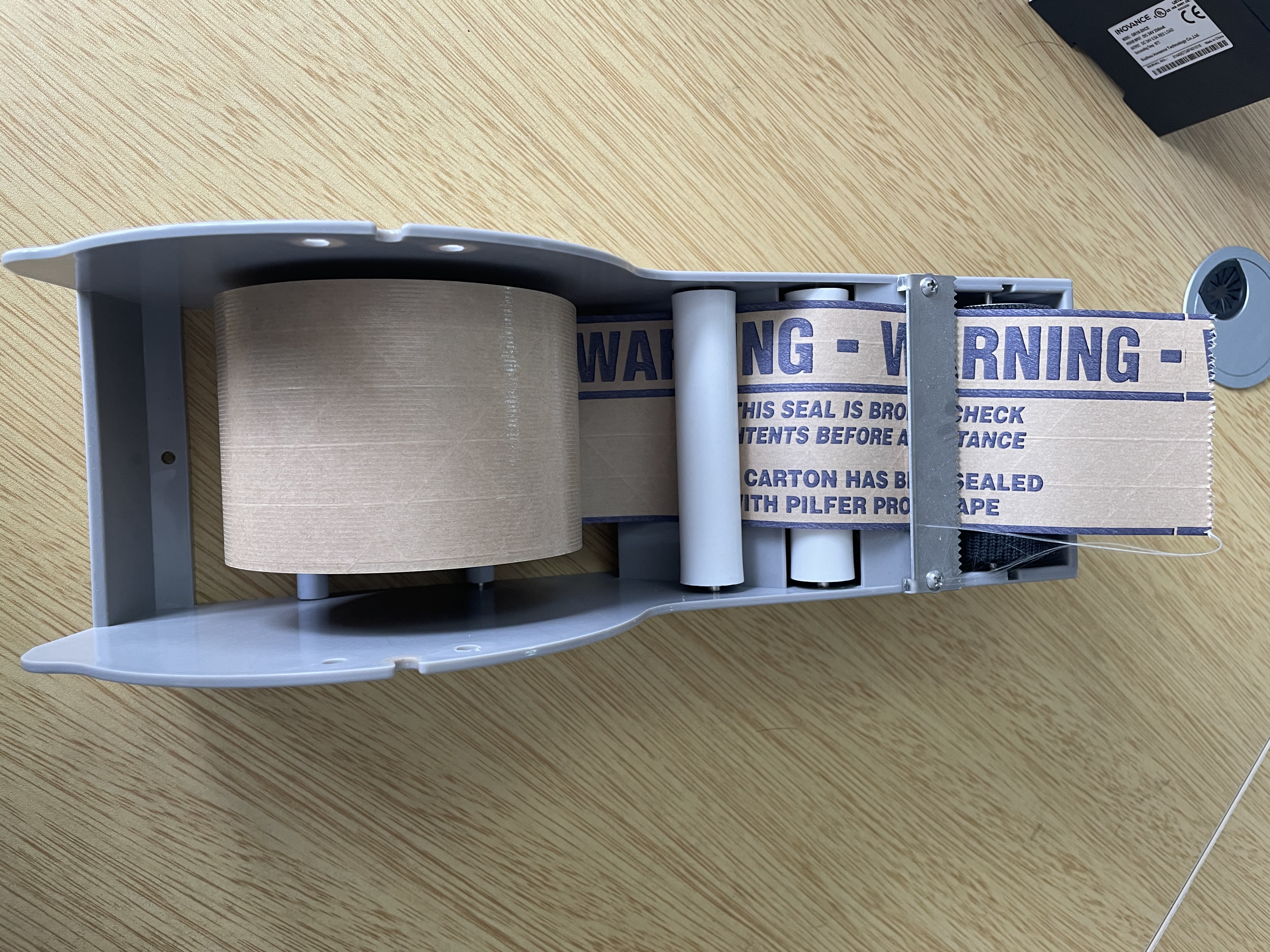
Water-activated tape in a tape dispenser

Water-activated tape is used for closing and sealing boxes. Before closing corrugated fiberboard boxes, the tape is wetted or remoistened. Such tape is usually 3 inches (or 7.5 cm) wide.

Gummed tapes specifications are the subject of ASTM standard D5749.

=== Heat-sensitive tape ===
Heat-activated tape is usually tack-free until it is activated by a heat source. This is particularly useful in the semiconductor industry.

=== Drywall tape ===
Drywall tape is paper, cloth, or mesh, sometimes with a gummed or PSA adhesive. It is used to make the joints between sheets of drywall materials.

== See also ==
- Tape dispenser
- Duct tape
