= Duct tape =

Type of adhesive tape

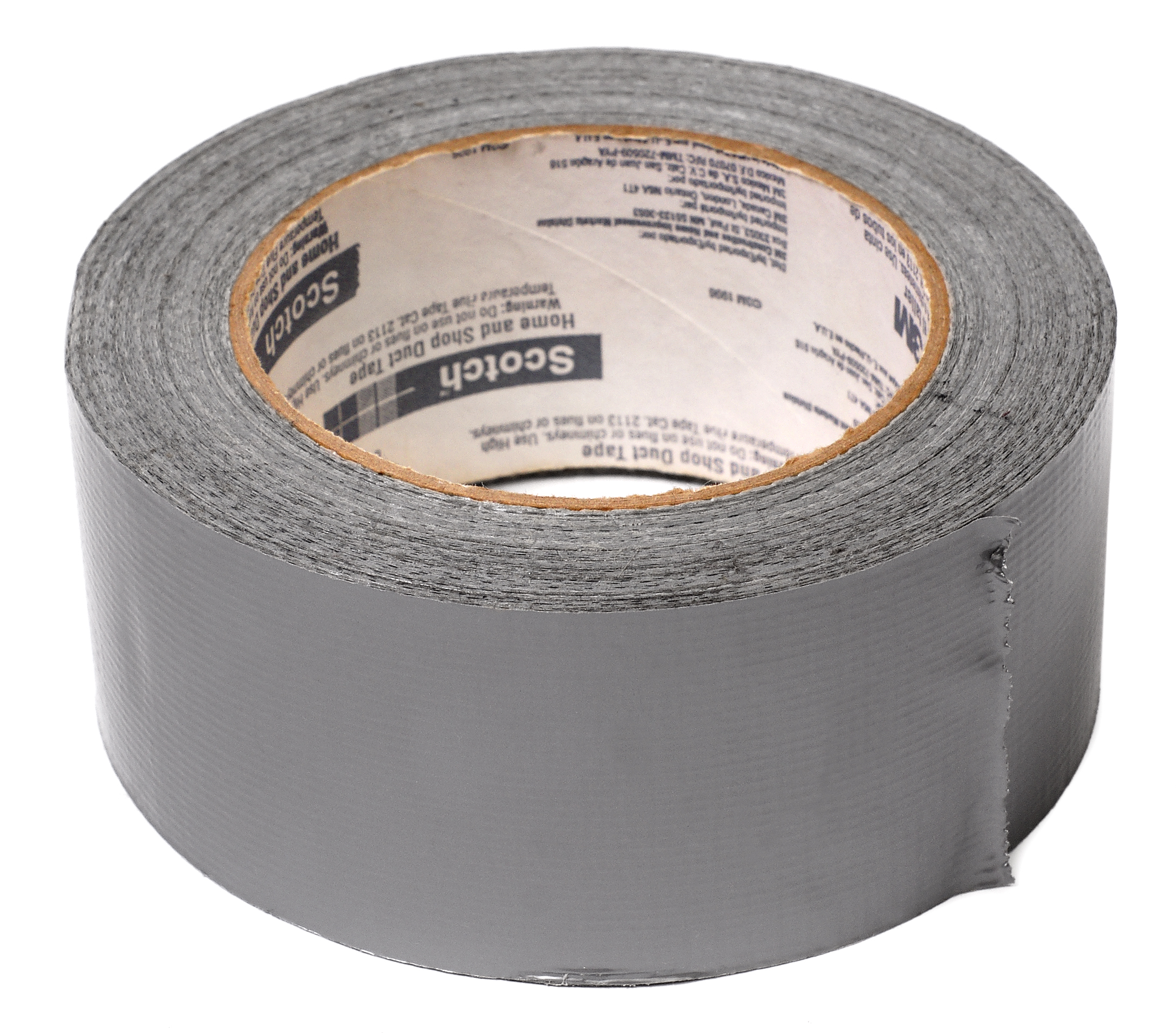
Powdered aluminum pigment gives traditional duct tape its silvery gray color.

Duct tape or duck tape is cloth- or scrim-backed pressure-sensitive tape, often coated with polyethylene. A variety of constructions exist using different backings and adhesives, and the term "duct tape" has been genericized to refer to all of them. A variation is heat-resistant foil tape useful for sealing heating and cooling ducts, produced because standard duct tape fails when used on heating ducts.

Duct tape is generally silvery gray in color, but also available in other colors and printed designs, from whimsical yellow ducks to practical camouflage patterns. It is often confused with gaffer tape which is designed to be non-reflective and cleanly removed, unlike duct tape.

During World War II, Revolite (then a division of Johnson & Johnson) developed an adhesive tape made from a rubber-based adhesive applied to a durable duck cloth backing. This tape resisted water and was used to seal some ammunition cases during that period.

"Duck tape" is recorded in the Oxford English Dictionary as having been in use since 1899 and "duct tape" (described as "perhaps an alteration of earlier duck tape") since 1965.

== History ==
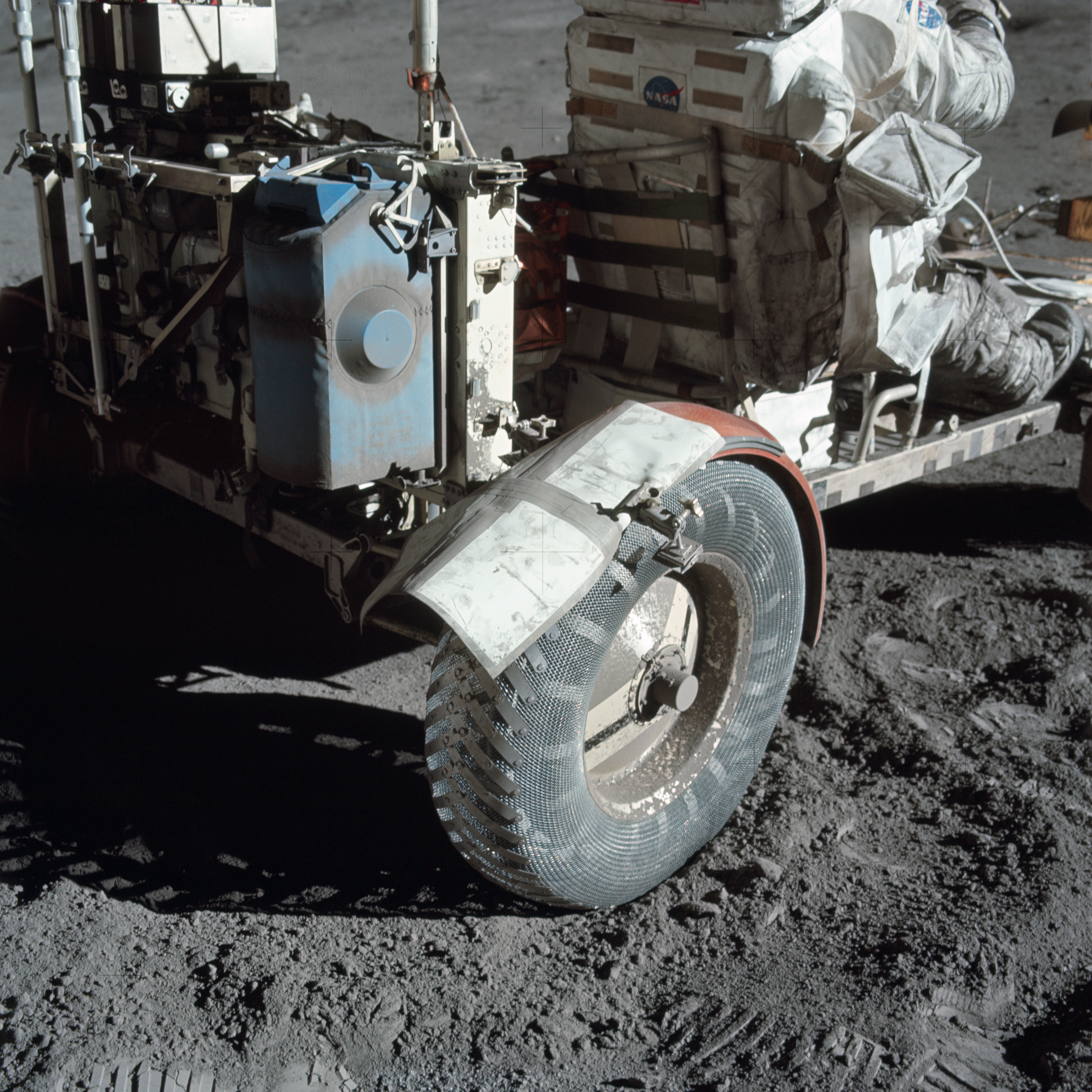
Wheel fender extension to keep down lunar dust improvised using duct tape during the Apollo 17 mission

The first material called "duck tape" was long strips of plain non-adhesive cotton duck cloth used in making shoes stronger, for decoration on clothing, and for wrapping steel cables or electrical conductors to protect them from corrosion or wear. For instance, in 1902, steel cables supporting the Manhattan Bridge were first covered in linseed oil then wrapped in duck tape before being laid in place. In the 1910s, certain boots and shoes used canvas duck fabric for the upper or for the insole, and duck tape was sometimes sewn in for reinforcement. In 1936, the US-based Insulated Power Cables Engineers Association specified a wrapping of duck tape as one of many methods used to protect rubber-insulated power cables. In 1942, Gimbel's department store offered venetian blinds that were held together with vertical strips of duck tape.

Glue backed or impregnated adhesive tapes of various sorts were in use by the 1910s, including rolls of cloth tape with adhesive coating one side. White adhesive tape made of cloth soaked in rubber and zinc oxide was used in hospitals to bind wounds, but other tapes such as friction tape or electrical tape could be substituted in an emergency. In 1930, the magazine Popular Mechanics described how to make adhesive tape at home using plain cloth tape soaked in a heated liquid mixture of rosin and rubber from inner tubes.

In 1923, tape pioneer Richard Gurley Drew at 3M invented masking tape, a paper-based tape with a mildly sticky adhesive intended to be temporarily used and removed rather than left in place permanently. In 1925, this became the Scotch brand masking tape. In 1930, Drew developed a transparent cellophane-based tape, dubbed Scotch tape. This tape was widely used beginning in the Great Depression to repair household items. Neither of these inventions was based on cloth tape.

The ultimate wide-scale adoption of duck tape, today generally referred to as duct tape, came from ordnance worker Vesta Stoudt. Stoudt was worried that problems with ammunition box seals could cost soldiers precious time in battle, so she wrote to President Franklin D. Roosevelt in 1943 with the idea to seal the boxes with a fabric tape prototype which she had tested. The letter was forwarded to the War Production Board, which put Johnson & Johnson on the job. The Revolite division of Johnson & Johnson had made medical adhesive tapes based on duck cloth from 1927, and a team headed by Revolite's Johnny Denoye and Johnson & Johnson's Bill Gross developed the new adhesive tape, designed to be ripped by hand, not cut with scissors.

Their new unnamed product was made of thin cotton duck coated in waterproof polyethylene (plastic) with a layer of rubber-based gray adhesive (branded as "Polycoat") bonded to one side. It was easy to apply and remove and was soon adapted to repair military equipment quickly, including vehicles and weapons. This tape, colored in army-standard matte olive drab, was widely used by the soldiers. After the war, the duck tape product was sold in hardware stores for household repairs. The Melvin A. Anderson Company of Cleveland, Ohio, acquired the rights to the tape in 1950. It was commonly used in construction to wrap air ducts. Following this application, the name "duct tape" came into use in the 1950s, along with tape products that were colored silvery gray like tin ductwork. Specialized heat- and cold-resistant tapes were developed for heating and air-conditioning ducts. By 1960, a St. Louis, Missouri, HVAC company, Albert Arno, Inc., trademarked the name "Ductape" for their "flame-resistant" duct tape, capable of holding together at 350–400 °F (177–204 °C).

In 1971, Jack Kahl bought the Anderson firm and renamed it Manco. In 1975, Kahl rebranded the duct tape made by his company. He was able to trademark the brand "Duck Tape" and market his product complete with a yellow cartoon duck logo. Manco chose the term "Duck", the tape's original name, as "a play on the fact that people often refer to duct tape as 'duck tape'", and as a marketing differentiation to stand out against other sellers of duct tape. In 1979, the Duck Tape marketing plan involved sending out greeting cards with the duck branding, four times a year, to 32,000 hardware managers. This mass of communication combined with colorful, convenient packaging helped Duck Tape become popular. From a near-zero customer base, Manco eventually controlled 40% of the duct tape market in the US. Acquired by Henkel in 1998, Duck Tape was sold to Shurtape Technologies in 2009. Shurtape introduced a strong, weather-resistant version called "T-Rex Tape". "Ultimate Duck", which had been Henkel's top-of-the-line variety, is still sold in the United Kingdom. Ultimate Duck, T-Rex Tape, and the competing Gorilla Tape all advertise "three-layer technology".

After profiting from Scotch Tape in the 1930s, 3M had produced military materiel during World War II and by 1946 had developed the first practical vinyl electrical tape. By 1977, the company was selling a heat-resistant duct tape for heating ducts. In the late 1990s, 3M's tape division had an annual turnover of $300 million and was the US industry leader. In 2004, 3M released a semi-transparent duct tape, with a clear polyethylene film and white fiberglass mesh.

== Manufacture ==
Modern duct tape is made variously from cotton, polyester, nylon, rayon, or fiberglass mesh fabric to provide strength. The fabric, a very thin gauze called "scrim", is laminated to a backing of low-density polyethylene (LDPE). The color of the LDPE is provided by various pigments; the usual gray color comes from powdered aluminum mixed into the LDPE. Two tape widths are common: 1.9 in (48 mm) and 2 in (51 mm). Other widths are also offered. The largest commercial rolls of duct tape were made in 2005 for Henkel, with 3.78 inches (9.6 cm) width, a roll diameter of 64 inches (160 cm) and weighing 650 pounds (290 kg).

== Common uses ==
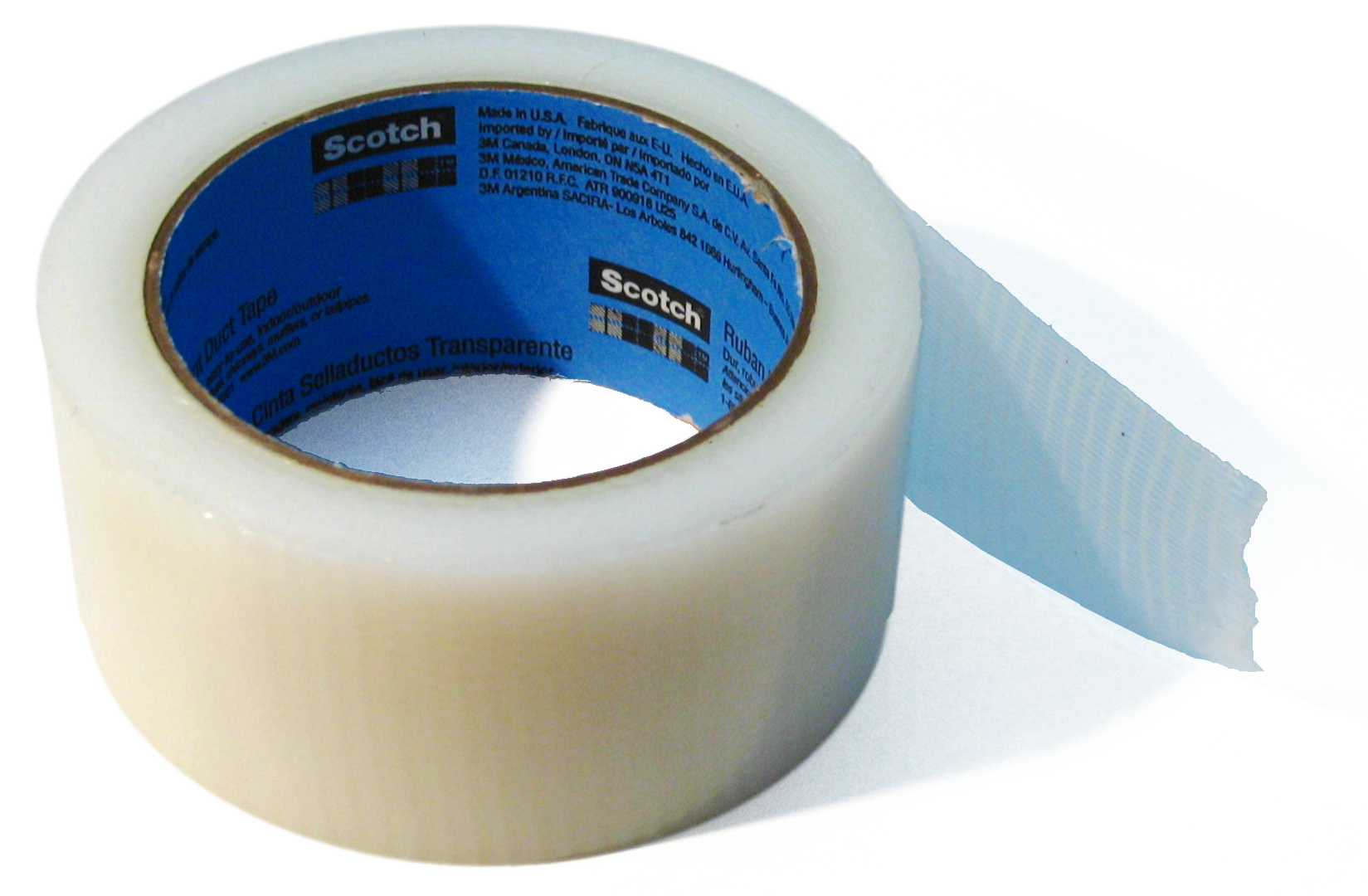
Semi-transparent duct tape

Duct tape is commonly used in situations that require a strong, flexible, and very sticky tape. Some have a long-lasting adhesive and resistance to weathering.

A specialized version, gaffer tape, which does not leave a sticky residue when removed, is preferred by gaffers in the theatre, motion picture and television industries.

=== Ductwork ===
The product now commonly called duct tape has largely been displaced in HVAC uses with specialized foil tapes designed for sealing heating and ventilation ducts (sometimes referred to erroneously as "duct tapes").

Common duct tape carries no safety certifications such as UL or Proposition 65, which means the tape may burn violently, producing toxic smoke; it may cause ingestion and contact toxicity, it can have irregular mechanical strength, and its adhesive may have low life expectancy. Its use in ducts has been prohibited by the state of California and by building codes in many other places.

Research was conducted in 1998 on standard duct tape at Lawrence Berkeley National Laboratory, Environmental Energy Technologies Division, which concluded that under challenging but realistic conditions duct tape becomes brittle, fails, and may even fall off completely.

=== Spaceflight ===
Interviewer: And duct tape works in the vacuum of space as well as it does here?
Walker: Oh, yes. Yes, it does. It sticks.

— Charles D. Walker, describing duct tape's use on STS-51-D

According to NASA engineer Jerry Woodfill duct tape had been stowed on board every mission since early in the Gemini program.

NASA engineers and astronauts have used duct tape in their work, including in some emergency situations. One such usage occurred in 1970 when Woodfill was working in Mission Control, when the square carbon dioxide filters from Apollo 13's failed command module had to be modified to fit round receptacles in the lunar module, which was being used as a lifeboat after an explosion en route to the Moon. A workaround used duct tape and other items on board Apollo 13, with the ground crew relaying instructions to the flight crew. The lunar module's CO_{2} scrubbers started working again, saving the lives of the three astronauts on board.

Ed Smylie, who designed the scrubber modification in just two days, said later that he knew the problem was solvable when it was confirmed that duct tape was on the spacecraft: "I felt like we were home free," he said in 2005. "One thing a Southern boy will never say is, 'I don't think duct tape will fix it.'"

Duct tape, referred to as "...good old-fashioned American gray tape..." was used by the Apollo 17 astronauts on the Moon to improvise a repair to a damaged fender on the lunar rover, preventing possible damage from the spray of lunar dust as they drove.

=== Military ===
In the US submarine fleet, an adhesive cloth tape is called "EB Green," as the duct tape used by Electric Boat was green. It is also called "duck tape", "riggers' tape", "hurricane tape", or "100-mph tape"; a name that comes from the use of a specific variety of duct tape that was supposed to withstand up to 100 mph (160 km/h; 87 kn) winds. The tape is so named because it was used during the Vietnam War to repair or balance helicopter rotor blades.

=== Alternative uses ===
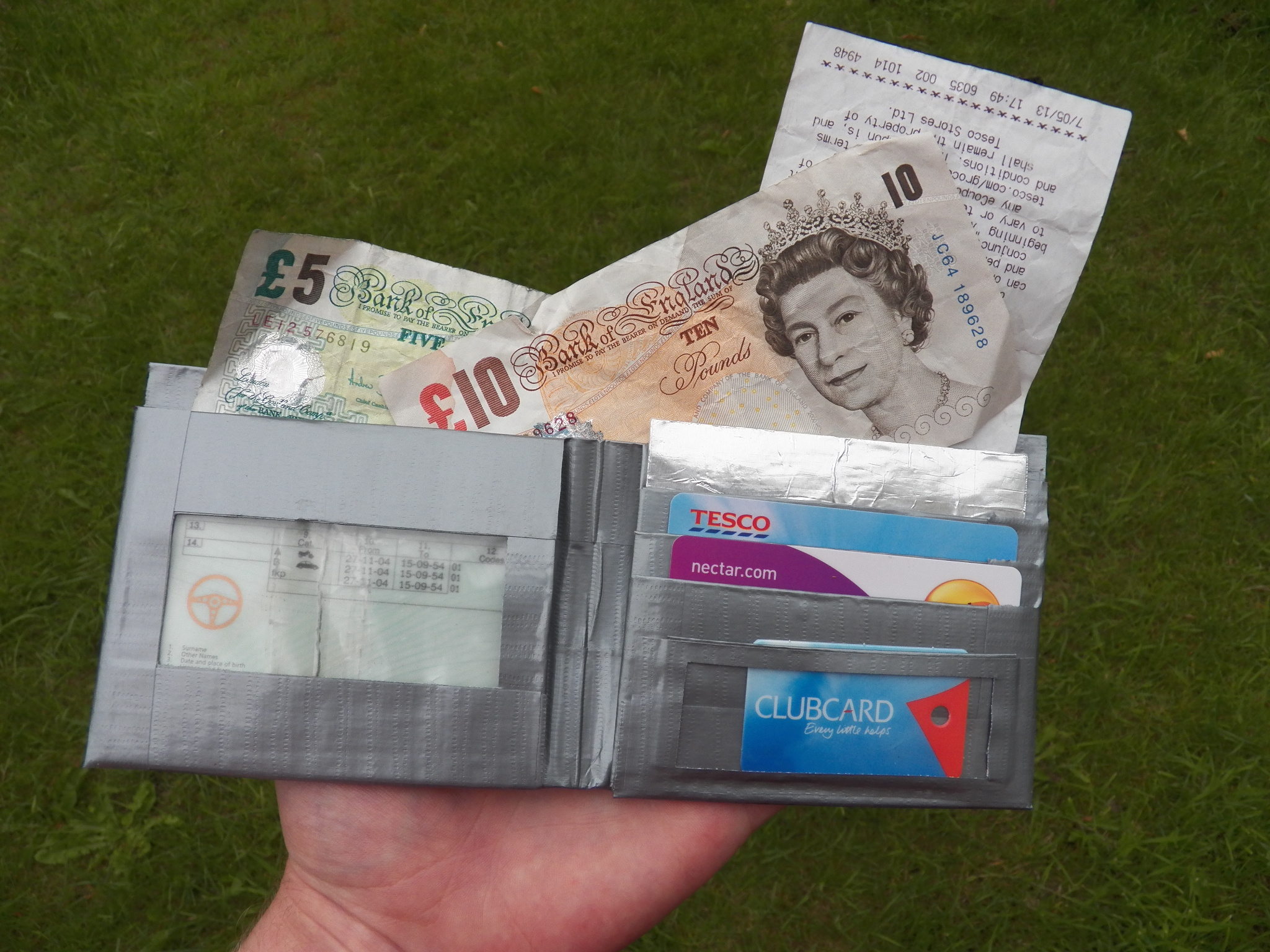
A wallet constructed mainly from duct tape

Duct tape occlusion therapy (DTOT) is a method intended to treat warts by covering them with duct tape for an extended period. The evidence for its effectiveness is poor; thus, it is not recommended as routine treatment. However, other studies suggest the duct tape treatment is more effective than existing medical options. Duct tape is often used in shoe repair due to its resiliency.

Duct tape has been used to temporarily fix Apple's iPhone 4 dropped call issue, as an alternative to Apple's own rubber case.

== In popular culture ==
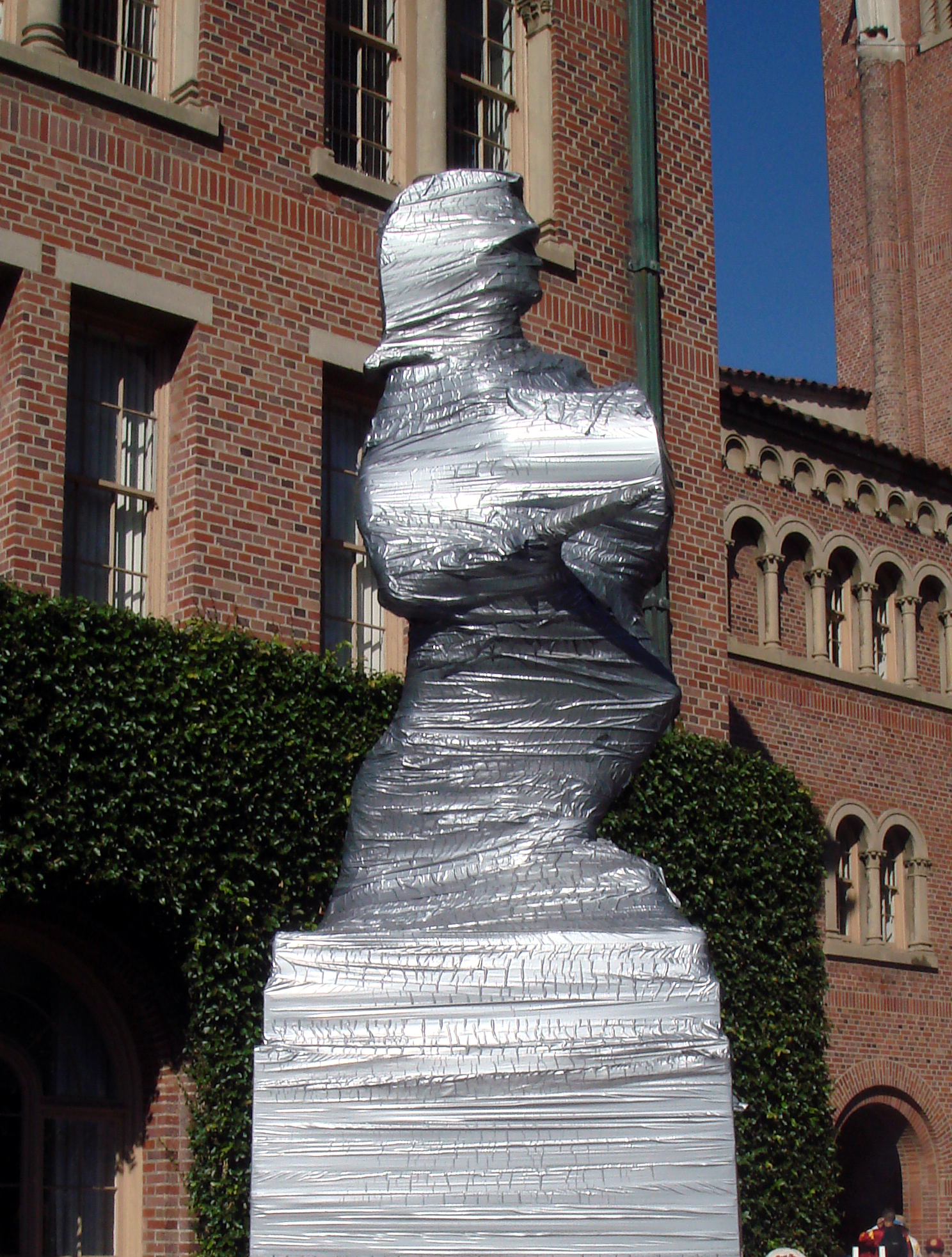
USC's Tommy Trojan statue wrapped in duct tape to protect it from crosstown football rival UCLA

The sitcom The Red Green Show's title character often used duct tape (which he dubbed "the handyman's secret weapon") as both a shortcut to proper fastening as well as for unconventional uses. The series sometimes showcased fan duct tape creations. The series had a feature film based on it entitled Duct Tape Forever and several VHS/DVD compilations of the show's use of the tape have been released. Since 2000, series star Steve Smith (as "Red Green") has been the "Ambassador of Scotch Duct Tape" for 3M.

The Discovery Channel series MythBusters featured duct tape in a number of myths that involve non-traditional uses. Confirmed myths include suspending a car for a period of time, building a functional cannon, a two-person sailboat, a two-person canoe (with duct tape paddles), a two-person raft, Roman sandals, a chess set, a leak proof water canister, rope, a hammock that can support the weight of an adult male, holding a car in place, a bridge that spanned the width of a dry dock, and a full-scale functional trebuchet with duct tape as the only binder. In the episode "Duct Tape Plane", the MythBusters repaired (and eventually replaced) the skin of a lightweight airplane with duct tape and flew it a few meters above a runway.

Garrison Keillor's radio show A Prairie Home Companion included comedic fictional commercials sponsored by the "American Duct Tape Council".

In 2019 Italian artist Maurizio Cattelan created a concept art piece titled Comedian involving taping a banana to a wall using silver duct tape. The piece was exhibited briefly at the Art Basel in Miami.

== Duct tape alert ==
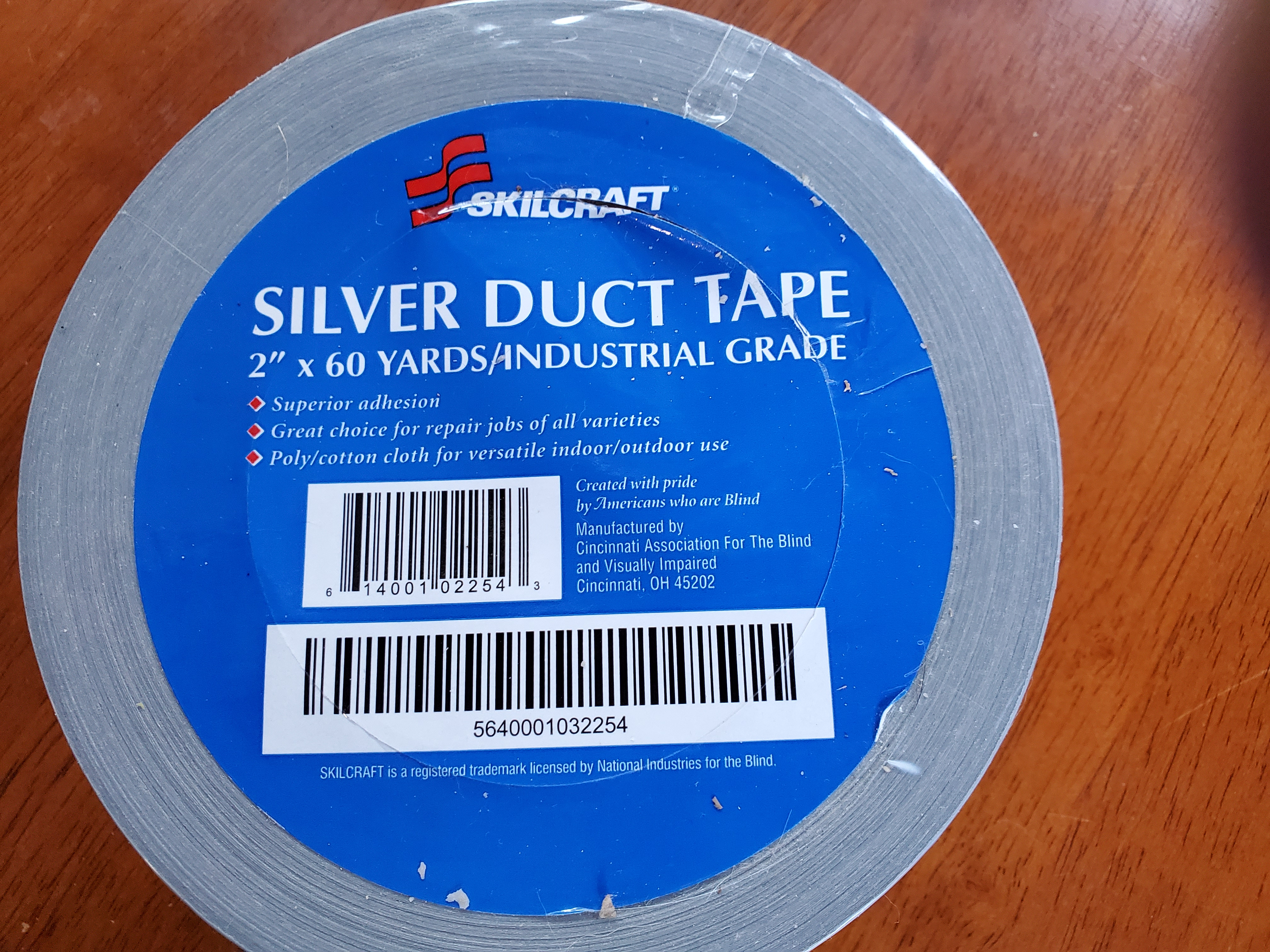
Duct tape distributed by Skilcraft, whose primary customer is the U.S. federal government

The term duct tape alert refers to the recommendations made by the U.S. Department of Homeland Security on February 10, 2003, that Americans should prepare for a biological, chemical, or radiological terrorist attack by assembling a "disaster supply kit", including duct tape and plastic (presumably to attempt to seal one's home against nuclear, chemical, and biological contaminants), among other items. The recommendations followed an increase in the Department's official threat level to "orange", or "high risk", citing "recent intelligence reports". According to press reports, the recommendations caused a surge in demand for duct tape.

== See also ==
- List of adhesive tapes
- Speed tape
- Gaffer tape

== Specifications ==
- ASTM International ASTM D5486 Standard Specification for Pressure-Sensitive Tape for Packaging, Box Closure, and Sealing, Type IV woven cloth backing
- ASTM D580 Standard Specification for Greige Woven Glass Tapes and Webbings
- ASTM D4514-12 Standard Specification for Friction Tape
- ASTM D2754-10 Standard Specification for High-Temperature Glass Cloth Pressure-Sensitive Electrical Insulating Tape
- MODUK DEF STAN 81-25, EN-Tape Pressure-Sensitive Adhesive (Water Resistant Fabric)
- McDonnell-Douglas DMS1968E
- Lockheed LCP-86-1226-A
- Boeing D 6-8099
- Ford specification ESB-M3G71-B
- etc.

=== Books ===
- "Pressure-Sensitive Adhesives and Applications", Istvan Benedek, 2004, ISBN 0-8247-5059-4
- "Pressure Sensitive Adhesive Tapes", J. Johnston, PSTC, 2003, ISBN 0-9728001-0-7
- "Pressure Sensitive Formulation", I. Benedek, VSP, 2000, ISBN 90-6764-330-0
