= Richard Gurley Drew =

American inventor (1899–1980)

- Born: June 22, 1899; Saint Paul, Minnesota, U.S.
- Died: December 14, 1980 (aged 81); Santa Barbara, California, U.S.
- Occupation: Inventor

Richard Gurley Drew (June 22, 1899 – December 14, 1980) was an American inventor who worked for Johnson and Johnson, Permacel Co., and 3M in St. Paul, Minnesota, where he invented masking tape and cellophane tape.

== Biography ==
When Drew joined 3M in St. Paul, Minnesota in 1921, it was a modest manufacturer of sandpaper. While testing their new Wetordry sandpaper at auto shops, Drew was intrigued to learn that the two-tone auto paintjobs so popular in the Roaring Twenties were difficult to manage at the border between the two colors. In response, after two years of work in 3M's labs, Drew invented the first masking tape (1925), a two-inch-wide tan paper strip backed with a light, pressure-sensitive adhesive.

The first tape had adhesive along its edges but not in the middle. In its first trial run, it fell off the car and the frustrated auto painter growled at Drew, "take this tape back to those Scotch bosses of yours and tell them to put more adhesive on it!" (By "Scotch", he meant "cheap".) The nickname stuck, both to Drew's improved masking tape, and to his 1930 invention, Scotch Brand cellulose tape.

In 1930 he came up with the world's first transparent cellophane adhesive tape (called sellotape in the UK and Scotch tape in the United States). During the Great Depression, people began using Scotch tape to repair items rather than replace them. This was the beginning of 3M’s diversification into all manner of marketplaces and helped them to flourish in spite of the Great Depression.

Drew died in 1980 in Santa Barbara, California.
