= Duck tape =

Duck tape may refer to:

- Duck tape, an alternative and the original term for duct tape
  - Duck tape, or Cotton duck, a similar cloth
  - Duck Tape, a specific brand of tape produced by ShurTech Brands
- Duck Tape, a 2013 mixtape by Duck Sauce
