= David Cook =

David Cook may refer to:

== Entertainment ==
- David Cook (game designer) (active since 1980s), American game designer for TSR
- David Cook (singer) (born 1982), winner of the seventh season of American Idol
  - David Cook (album) (released 2008), the singer's debut album
- David Cook (writer) (1940–2015), British novelist, screenwriter, and TV presenter
- Dave Cook (born 1983), Scottish comic writer
- David Essex (David Albert Cook, born 1947), British pop and rock singer

== Politics ==
- David Cook (Arizona politician) (active since 2016), member of the Arizona House of Representatives
- David Cook (Arkansas politician) (born 1950), member of the Arkansas House of Representatives
- David Cook (Northern Ireland politician) (1944–2020), politician of the Alliance Party of Northern Ireland
- David Cook (Texas politician) (born 1971), member of the Texas House of Representatives and former mayor of Mansfield, Texas
- Dave Cook (politician) (1941–1993), British communist politician and climber

== Sports ==
- David Cook (cricketer) (1936–2021), English cricketer
- David Cook (cyclist) (born 1969), British Olympic cyclist
- David Cook (racing driver) (born 1975), British former racing driver
- Dave Cook (American football) (1912–1949), American football player

== Other people ==
- David Cook (artist), found object artist in Minneapolis and Chicago
- David Cook (Blockbuster founder) (active since 1978), American businessman
- David Cook (historian) (active since 2003), American professor and historian of Islam at Rice University
- David Cook (literary critic) (1929–2003), British professor of East African literature
- David C. Cook (1875–2016), founder of a namesake nonprofit Christian publisher in Colorado Springs, Colorado
- David J. Cook (1840/2–1907), Old West detective and marshal
- David J. Cook (administrator) (fl, 1990s–2020s), American academic administrator and current president of Iowa State University
- E. David Cook (21st century), American religion professor at Wheaton College

== See also ==
- David Cooke (disambiguation)
