= Lutterloh (sewing) =

Pattern-drafting system for pattern-cutting sewing

Lutterloh-System (German pronunciation: [ˈlʊtɐloː]) is a pattern-drafting system intended for home pattern-cutting sewing. It was developed in Germany in the 1935 by Luise Aigenberger - later Lutterloh. Her grand-children run the company with Marcus Lutterloh and his mother being chiefly responsible for the creation of the designs; Frank and Ralph Lutterloh run the USA and German outlets.

It has been issued in 17 different languages including English, German, French, Dutch/Belgie, Italian, Spanish, Mexican, Czech Republic/Slovakian, Hungarian, Norwegian, Swiss and Russian. The books/binders have been issued under several names, depending on the language – Der Goldene Schnitt, La Coupe D'Or, De Gouden Snit, Zloty Kroj, Az Arani Szabasminta, Det Gylne Snitt, Det Gyllene Snittet, Slaty Strih, Kultainen Kuosi, Altin Method, Il Taglio D'Oro, The Golden Rule, Золотая BbikPonka and El Corte De Oro.

Rather than draft patterns from scratch, the person drafting the pattern refers to a book of designs for garments, and then uses a specific system of radial grading – which is based on the golden ratio – to create full-size pattern pieces in the desired size. The system uses a tape measure that has a scaled section which allows the templates to be drafted to suit the chest and hip measurement of the garment-wearer.

Since 1935, 339 seasonal supplements have been issued quarterly with new designs to add to the collection. There are also themed special editions specially for children, men and vintage styles. New issues are released in February, May, August and November each year.

In the regular kit, which accommodates sizes from 50 cm (20 in) up to 140 cm (55 in), there is an introductory section describing how to use the system, and also a guide to some basic sewing techniques for common elements of garment construction.

There are formal and casual designs which include:

- styles with additional ease included for those with a fuller figure [denoted by an icon of a solid-black mannequin];
- slim-line styles for the teens [denoted by a hollow-white mannequin];
- bridal;
- maternity [pram icon];
- swim/beachwear;
- sportswear.

The regular templates are printed in yellow, to match the yellow/white scaling section of the regular tape measure.

There is also an XL/XXL kit that covers sizes from 110 cm (43 in) up to 170 cm (67 in) and has two special edition issues – #29 from 2001 and #35 from 2018.

The XL/XXL templates are printed in blue to match the blue scaling section of the XL/XXL tape measure.

The two Tape Measures cannot be used interchangeably because the scaling is different for the two kits.

There is a numbering system to the issues; Supplements containing at least 40 designs being combined into books and binders that have changed appearance occasionally through the history of the company. The contents of the binders change periodically.

While the numbering has been in place for the whole of the history of the Lutterloh-System it is easier since 1974 to know which Supplements are included.

The designs numbered 1, 41, 81, 121, 161, 201 and 241 have a Reg No printed below the publishing date [which is the part in roman numerals].
Ignore the first '0';
the next digits denote the supplement number;
the last 2 digits denote the season [2 = February [Spring], 5 = May [Summer], 8 = August [Autumn] and 11 = November [Winter]

Both the regular and the XL/XXL kits have a toolkit consisting of the Scaled Tape Measure, felt tip pen, drawing pins, scotch tape, which are used when drafting the templates.

The kits are issued in a yellow outer-box when new.
