= Michael Cook (cricketer) =

English cricketer

Personal information
- Full name: Michael Stephen Cook
- Born: 9 February 1939 (age 87); Edgbaston, Warwickshire, England
- Batting: Left-handed
- Role: Occasional wicket-keeper
- Relatives: David Cook (brother)

Domestic team information
- Years: Team
- 1961–1962: Warwickshire

Career statistics
Competition	First-class
Matches	2
Runs scored	110
Batting average	27.50
100s/50s	–/1
Top score	52
Balls bowled	–
Wickets	–
Bowling average	–
5 wickets in innings	–
10 wickets in match	–
Best bowling	–
Catches/stumpings	1/–
- Source: Cricinfo, 22 December 2011

Michael Stephen Cook (born 19 February 1939) is a former English cricketer. Cook was a left-handed batsman who occasionally fielded as a wicket-keeper. He was born at Edgbaston, Warwickshire.

Cook made two first-class appearances for Warwickshire, against Cambridge University in 1961 and Oxford University in 1962. Against Cambridge University at Mitchells and Butlers' Ground, Cook scored 52 in his maiden first-class innings before he was run out. In their second-innings, he was dismissed for 15 runs by Simon Douglas-Pennant, with Warwickshire winning the match by 51 runs. Against Oxford University at Edgbaston, Cook scored 27 runs in Warwickshire's first-innings before he was dismissed by Colin Drybrough, while in their second-innings he was dismissed by Ian Potter for 16 runs. Warwickshire won the match by 161 runs. These were his only major appearances for Warwickshire.

His brother, David, also played for Warwickshire.
