= Twig Tape =

Annual compilation album from students of University of Toronto Schools

Compilation album by students at University of Toronto
- Released: 1986 (first)

The Twig Tape is a compilation album of original music created by the students of University of Toronto Schools in annual volumes since 1986. Contributions from both alumni and current students are usually presented side-by-side to ensure a broad range of professional and amateur compositions. This frequently juxtaposes accomplished musicianship with budding creativity in an eclectic diversity of genres, including jazz, rock, electronic, and chamber music. Twig Tape volumes are generally released to coincide with the Schools' Art and Music Night in late May every year.

== Origins ==
John Fautley, long-time music teacher and former UTS Assistant Principal, is credited with championing the idea of a "musical yearbook" at the Schools. In the academic year of 1985–86, he assigned the task of writing a pop song to his music students and, at the time, someone suggested recording the results for posterity. By the end of that year, their idea had snowballed into a 90-minute compilation of brand-new songs, which was duplicated and sold as a memento of the students' achievements — much like UTS' yearbook, the Twig.

The first ever double-disc Twig Tape was released in 2002, containing a "Student LP" on the first CD and an "Alumni EP" on the second CD. Following that release, the division was abandoned — subsequent volumes returned to a mixed track listing.

== Name ==
UTS' motto is velut arbor ita ramus, which translates from Latin: "as the tree, so the branch". This reflects the institution's traditional association with the University of Toronto, since its Latin motto, velut arbor ævo, translates "as a tree with the passage of time". Accordingly, the Schools' annual yearbook was christened the Twig, and the Twig Tape followed suit (although the two entities are now entirely separated, except by title).

The word "Tape" is derived from the compilation's genesis on audio tape, which was the preferred medium of delivery for the first decade of its existence. The "Twig Disc" was released in 1996, with an aim to compile the best tracks from the original ten volumes, and in 1998 the annual compilation was first released on CD. Despite this change, the original name has been preserved for the sake of tradition, although the uninitiated may sometimes refer to it as the "Twig CD" in error. Such obscure traditions of language use are basically the same motivations which dictate that the word "Schools" in UTS' name should retain its grammatical status as a singular noun.

The art design used on the In 2005 cover was an extended visual pun on the name "Twig Tape" — photography of an actual twig covered in masking tape.

== Process ==
As with many extracurricular activities in the UTS community, the Twig Tape is organized and operated largely without guidance from teachers. UTS students are notorious for achieving technical and artistic wonders with extremely limited access to equipment and almost no teacher supervision (one example being the groundbreaking 1999 webcast of "Art & Music Night"); the Twig Tape reinforces this tradition.

John Fautley produced the first volume using a TASCAM 4-track tape recorder, but soon the students took on the entire project themselves. With each passing year, equipment and techniques improved as the student producers graduated and passed on what they had learned to their successors. One constant has remained: all performance, recording, mixing, mastering, design and distribution have remained "in-house" where possible and left to the discretion of student volunteers.

Unlike other high school music yearbooks, the Twig Tape is not an outlet for so-called "band geeks" to show off their performances of other peoples' songs, but a showcase for the broad range of musical treats from the entire school community. Alumni submissions are now accepted via the internet from all parts of the world, and copies of the Twig Tape have been spotted in the collections of prominent UTS graduates and other interested parties in the global community.

The Twig Tape is now encouraged and perpetuated by UTS' current Music Director, Judy Kay, and all proceeds from its sales are donated to the UTS music department. In the 2006–2007 school year, students created a Twig Tape website called uTunes.
