= Ian Potter (disambiguation) =

Ian Potter (1902–1994) was an Australian stockbroker, businessman and philanthropist.

Ian Potter may also refer to:

- Ian Potter (cricketer) (born 1938), a former English cricketer
- Ian Potter (rugby league) (born 1958), an English former professional rugby league footballer
- Ian Potter (writer), a British writer
- Ian Potter, Conservative councillor in Oakdale ward in Poole, Dorset, 2011 and 2015

== See also ==
- Ian Potter Centre: NGV Australia, an art gallery, part of the National Gallery Victoria, Melbourne, Australia
- Ian Potter Museum of Art, an art gallery at the University of Melbourne, Australia
- Ian Potter Sculpture Court, at the Monash University Museum of Art, Melbourne
