= Jack Kahl =

American businessman

Jack Kahl (September 20, 1940 – December 30, 2018) was an American businessman.

== Education ==
Kahl was a graduate of St. Edward High School (Ohio) and John Carroll University.

== Business career ==
Kahl was responsible for marketing duct tape as duck tape. Kahl was founder and chief executive of Manco.
