= Sellotape =

British brand of adhesive tape

- Company type: Public
- Founded: 1930s London, England
- Headquarters: Winsford, England
- Products: Sellotape, other adhesive stationery
- Owner: Henkel
- Website: sellotape.co.uk

Sellotape (/ˈsɛləˌteɪp/) is a British brand of transparent, cellulose-based, pressure-sensitive adhesive tape. Founded in the 1930s, it is the leading brand in the United Kingdom and is generally used for joining, sealing, attaching, and mending.

Similar to how the brand name Scotch Tape came to be used in Canada and the United States when referring to any brand of clear adhesive tape, Sellotape has become a genericised trademark in the United Kingdom and a number of other countries where it is sold.

== History ==
Sellotape was originally manufactured by Colin Kinninmonth and George Grey in the Acton area of London. The name was derived from Cellophane, at that time a trademarked name, with the "C" changed to "S" so the new name could be trademarked. It was made at a factory in Borehamwood from 1930 to about 1950, when it moved to Welwyn Garden City.

The range of tapes available in the 1950s and 1960s was immense compared with what is available today, including RBT (reinforced banding tape), metallic tapes, and a tape used for repairing PCBs. E.S. & A. Robinson were originally a packaging and paper products manufacturing company. From the 1960s to 1980s, the Sellotape company was part of Dickinson Robinson Group, a packaging and paper conglomerate. Sellotape Industrial was bought by Scapa Group plc in 1997, and the Sellotape company was bought by Henkel Consumer Adhesives in 2002. The company's products continue to be manufactured at a factory in Dunstable, though the company itself is headquartered in Winsford.

== Products ==
The Sellotape brand now covers a variety of tape products, and the word is frequently used to refer to other adhesive tapes in many countries due to its market exposure. As an example of a genericized trademark, it gained an entry in the Oxford English Dictionary in 1980.

== Use ==
The tape can be used to repair tears in paper, or to attach pieces of paper or cardboard together for modelling. On fragile paper surfaces the tape can only be used once, as removing it will either tear the paper or remove the top layer of rough cardboard; on smooth painted surfaces it can generally be removed without leaving any trace, though sometimes the adhesive can remain on the surface after prolonged periods of time. It does not affix items to such surfaces permanently.

== See also ==
- Adhesive tape
- Duct tape
- List of adhesive tapes
- Masking tape
- Scotch tape
