= Scotch tape =

American brand of pressure sensitive tapes

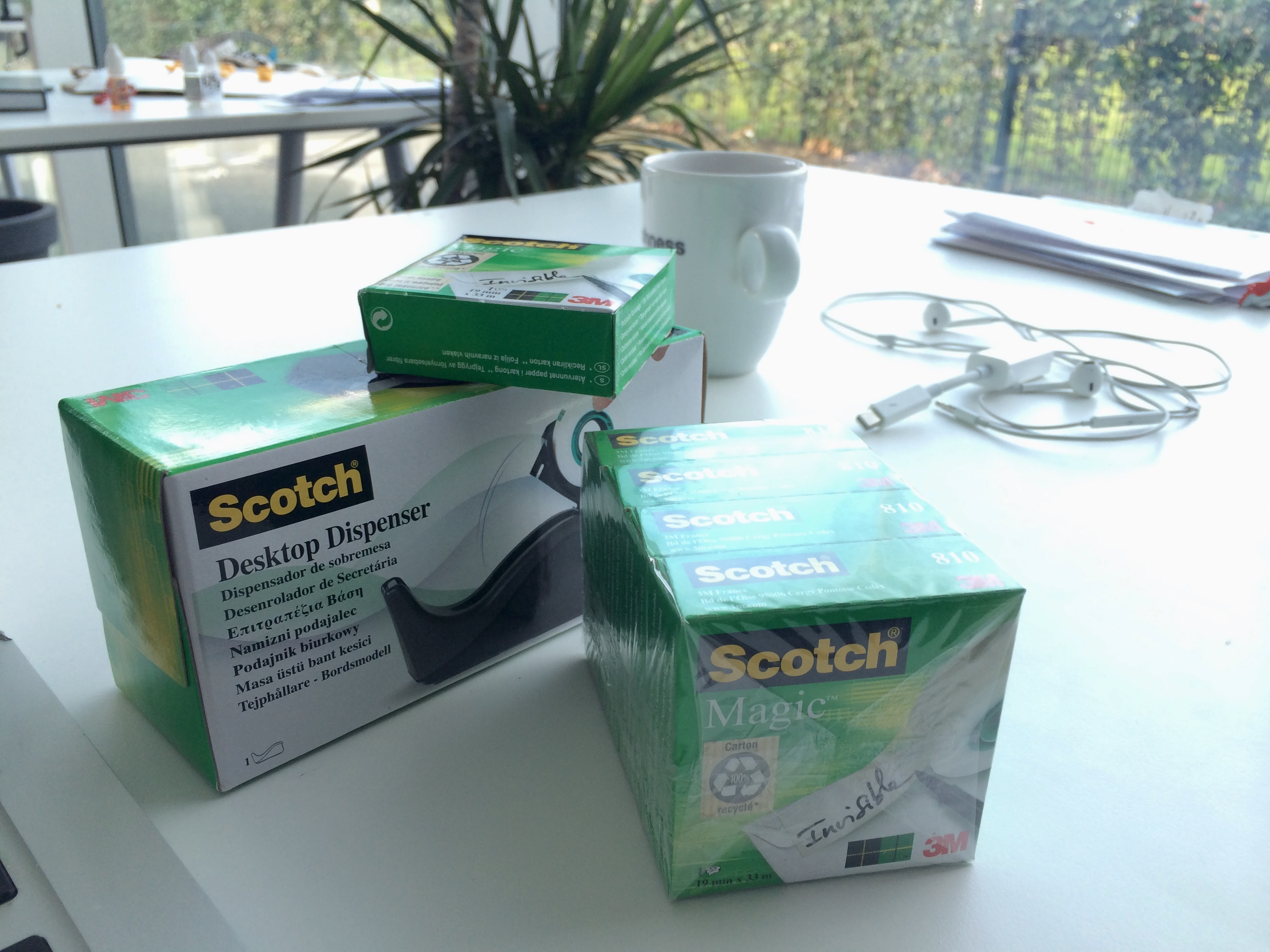
- Several packs of Scotch tape, including Magic Tape on the right
- Product type: Pressure-sensitive tape
- Current owner: 3M
- Country: United States
- Introduced: 1930; 96 years ago
- Website: scotchtape.com

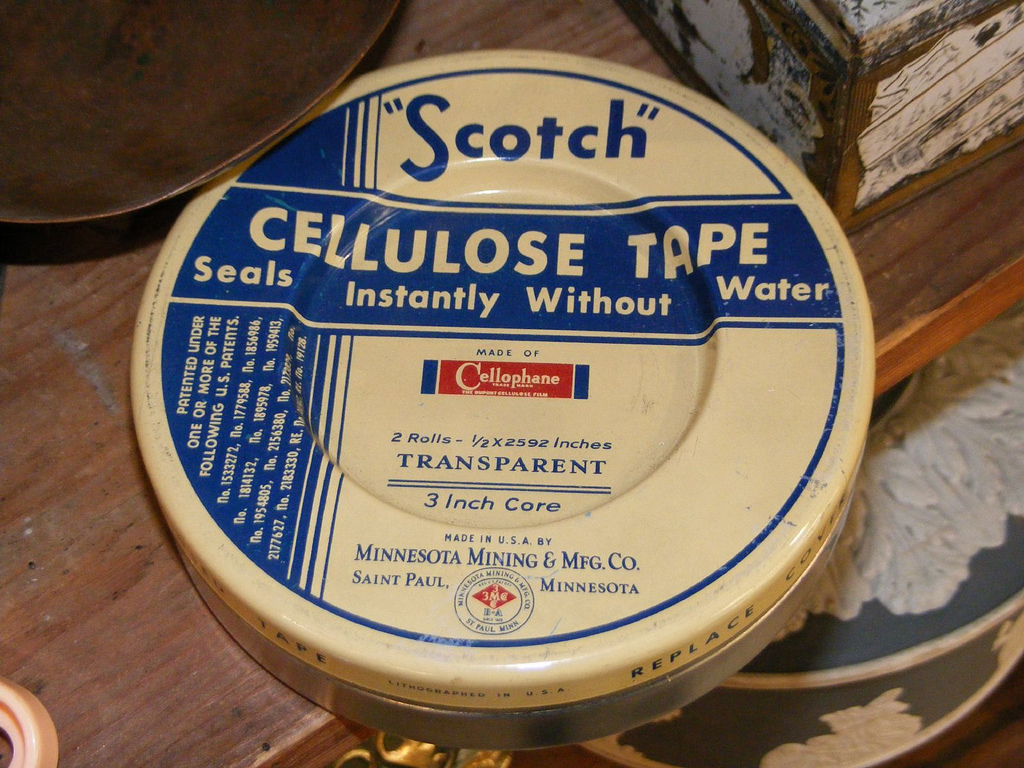
Antique Scotch brand package

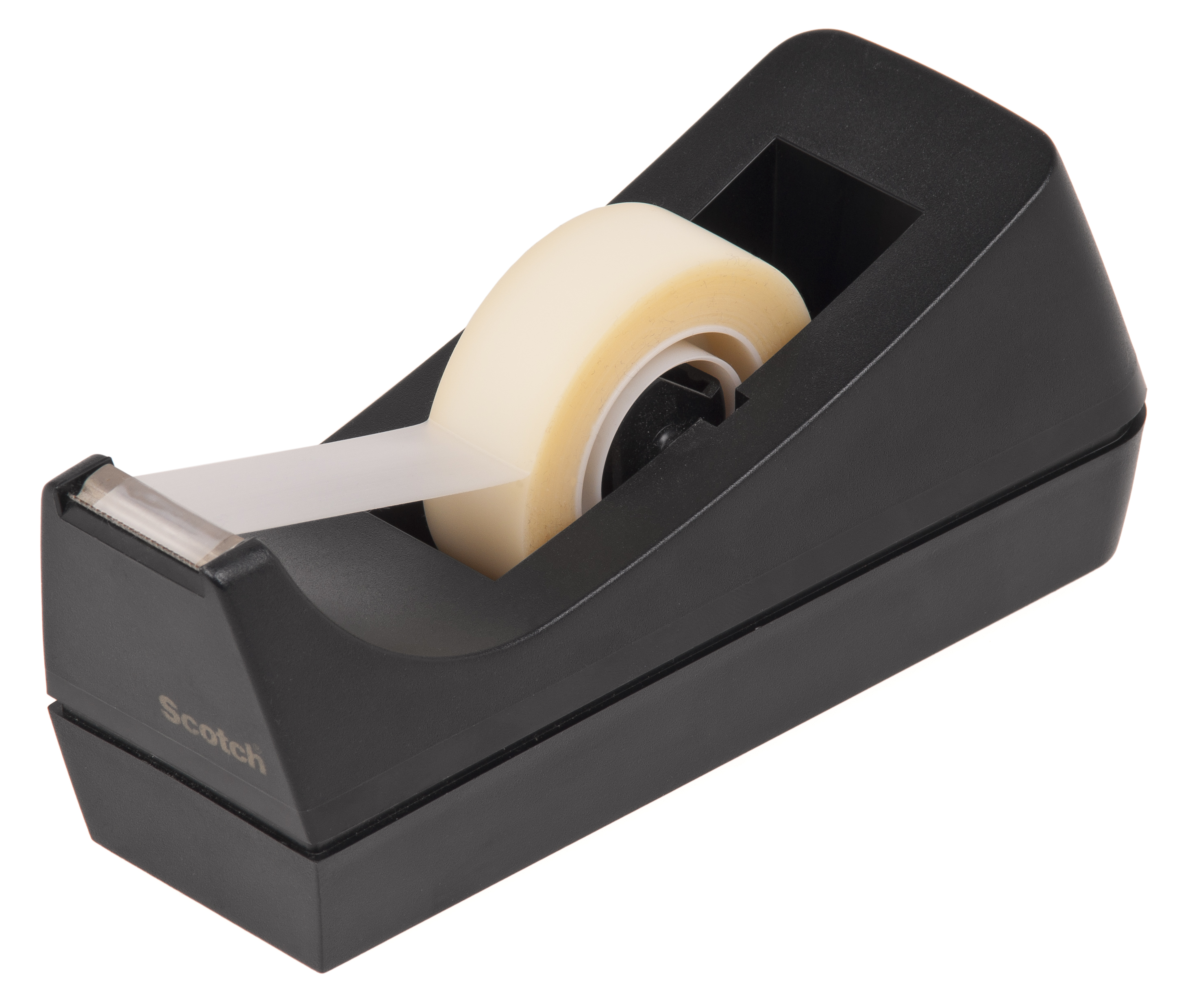
Tape dispenser for Scotch Magic Tape

Scotch is a brand name used for pressure sensitive tape and related products developed by 3M. It was first introduced by Richard Drew, who created the initial masking tape under the Scotch brand. The invention of Scotch-brand tape expanded its applications, making it suitable for sealing packages and conducting item repairs. Over time, Scotch tapes have been utilized in households and various industries.

== History ==
In 1930, Richard Drew, a 3M engineer, developed the first transparent sticky tape in St. Paul, Minnesota, with a material known as cellophane.

Drew's inspiration came from watching automotive engineers try to achieve smooth paintings on two-color cars. Existing adhesives would remove underlying paint along when they were removed, requiring expensive and time-consuming touch-up work. Drew used 3M's extensive portfolio of sandpaper adhesives to find one with just enough tackiness to stay put during the painting process, but also remove easily when complete. According to 3M company history, Drew attempted to apply adhesive to only the edges of the tape to prevent it from adhering too strongly. When that version failed in testing, a shop floor told Drew to, “go tell his Scotch bosses that they shouldn’t be so cheap with the adhesive and put it on all the way!” In those days, to say someone was being “Scotch” meant they were penny-pinching or miserly. The successful product would be named "Scotch" brand masking tape in 1925 and later evolved the product to be transparent. The need for a transparent version of the tape was driven by food packagers trying to use clear cellophane paper to wrap individual and custom portions of food. Without an adhesive tape, the edges of the package would need to be melted together, making it costly and time-consuming.

In 1932, John A. Borden, also a 3M engineer working with Drew, invented the "snail" style tape dispenser. The first versions were metal, but later versions would be made of plastic. During the Great Depression, the versatility and durability of Scotch tape led to a surge in demand, as customers used it to mend household items like books, curtains, clothing, etc. It had industrial applications as well: Goodyear used it to tape the inner supportive ribs of dirigibles to prevent corrosion.

Scotch tape become a cultural touchstone during the Great Depression, representing a desire to save money by repairing everyday items. Over the decades, it has come to represent the idea of "repair consumerism," where the average consumer can repair items they've purchased instead of replacing them.

== Trade names ==
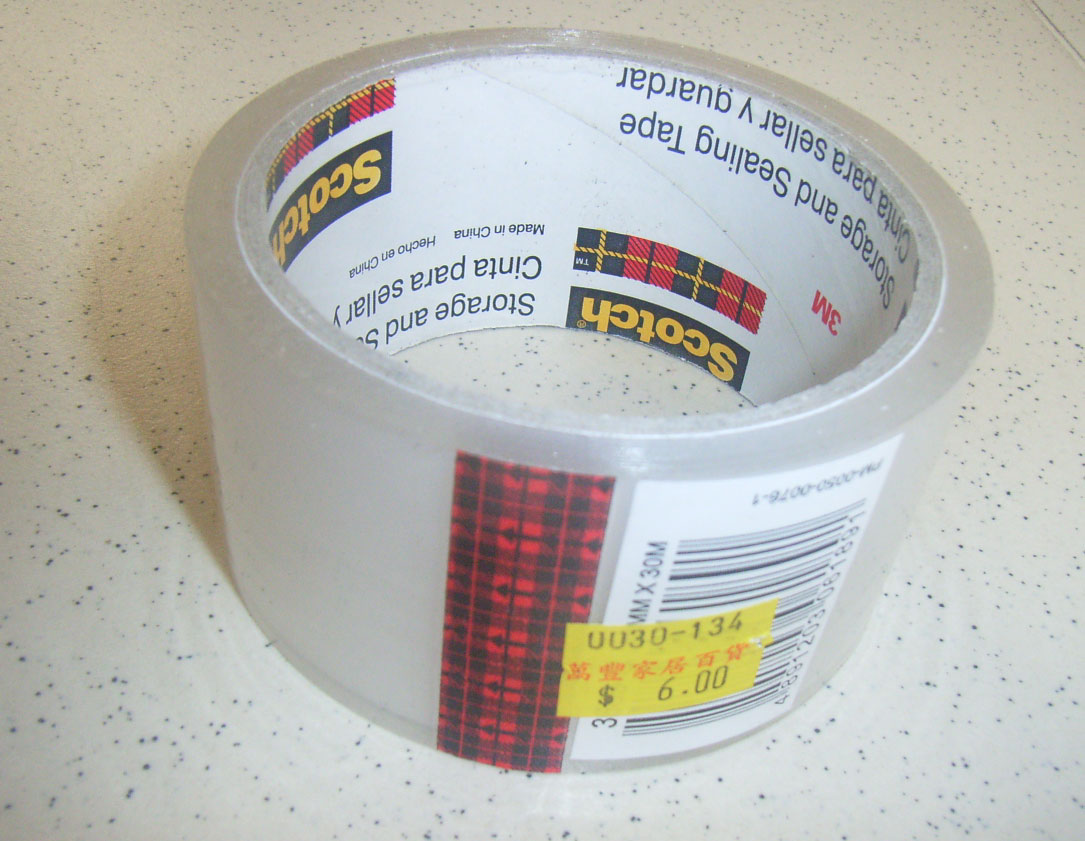
A Scotch brand box sealing tape

Modern Scotch brand acetate tape packaging showing the distinctive tartan design

Although Scotch is a trademark and a brand name, Scotch tape is sometimes used as a generic term, in a similar manner to Sellotape in several other countries. The Scotch brand includes many different constructions (backings, adhesives, etc.) and colors of tape.

The use of the term Scotch in the name was a pejorative meaning "parsimonious" in the 1920s and 1930s. The brand name Scotch came about around 1925 while Richard Drew was testing his first masking tape to determine how much adhesive he needed to add. The body shop painter became frustrated with the sample masking tape and exclaimed, "Take this tape back to those Scotch bosses of yours and tell them to put more adhesive on it!" The name was soon applied to the entire line of 3M tapes.

Scotty McTape, a kilt-wearing cartoon boy, was the brand's mascot for two decades, first appearing in 1944. The tartan design, a take on the Wallace tartan, was introduced in 1945.

The Scotch brand, Scotch Tape and Magic Tape are registered trademarks of 3M. Besides using Scotch as a prefix in its brand names (Scotchgard, Scotchlite, and Scotch-Brite), the company also used the Scotch name for its (mainly professional) audiovisual magnetic tape products, until the early 1990s when the tapes were branded solely with the 3M logo. In 1996, 3M exited the magnetic tape business, selling its assets to Quantegy (which is a spin-off of Ampex).

In the late 1960s, the Scotch theme was also applied to 3M's all-weather polyurethane Tartan track and the company's artificial grass, Tartan Turf.

=== Magic tape ===
Magic tape, also known as Magic transparent tape, is a brand within the Scotch tape family of adhesive tapes made by 3M, sold in distinctive plaid packaging.

Invented and introduced in 1961, it is the original matte finish tape. It appears frosty on the roll yet is invisible on paper. This quality makes it popular for gift-wrapping. Magic tape can be written upon with pen, pencil, or marker; comes in permanent and removable varieties; and resists drying out and yellowing.

In Japan, "Magic Tape" is a trademark of Kuraray for a hook-and-loop fastener system similar to Velcro. Instead, the katakana version of the word Mending Tape is used, i.e., メンディングテープ, along with the familiar green and yellow tartan branding.

=== Magnetic tape ===
In 1964, 3M released their "Dynarange" brand of magnetic tape used in reel-to-reel audio tape recording sold under either the Wollensak or Scotch brands. The company branched out to produce tapes for computer storage, cassette tapes and similar roles.

== X-rays ==
In 1953, Soviet scientists showed that triboluminescence caused by peeling a roll of an unidentified Scotch brand tape in a vacuum can produce X-rays. In 2008, American scientists performed an experiment that showed the rays can be strong enough to leave an X-ray image of a finger on photographic paper.

== See also ==
- Duct tape
- Pressure-sensitive tape
- Sellotape
- Velostat
- List of adhesive tapes
