= Permacel =

Industrial adhesive tape manufacturer in the United States

- Industry: Adhesive Tape Manufacturing
- Predecessor: Revolite Corporation
- Defunct: September 30, 2009
- Fate: Acquired by Nitto Denko
- Headquarters: Pleasant Prairie, Wisconsin, United States
- Website: www.permacel.com

Permacel, a division of the Nitto Denko company, is an industrial adhesive tape manufacturing company. Headquartered in Pleasant Prairie, Wisconsin, United States, the company produces 350 kinds of tape used in a broad range of industries, including paper masking tape, reinforced strapping tape, paper packaging tape, PTFE tape, film tape, double coated tape, transfer tape, repulpable tape, thread seal, foil tape, surface protective films and vinyl tape. Permacel manufactured and sold graphic art tapes until 2004 when that part of their business was sold to Shurtape Technologies.

== History ==
In the 1920s, a small Detroit druggist had uncovered and was selling Johnson & Johnson surgical tape to a car manufacturer who used the tape for masking two-tone paint jobs. By 1927, Johnson & Johnson recognized the market potential for tape products in the industrial market and a small department was formed to market "masking tape". Cellophane and paper tapes were soon developed for the industrial market. This new division of Johnson & Johnson was called the Revolite Corporation. When it opened it was located in a small building next to the Johnson & Johnson Headquarters in New Brunswick, NJ. On January 1, 1938, Revolite was renamed the Industrial Tape Corporation and in 1953 ITC became Permacel and it moved to its new location on Route 1 in North Brunswick, NJ. The name came from the brand-name of the first product shipped from its plant, "Permacel", a masking tape. In 1982, Permacel was acquired by Avery International, a self-adhesive label company. In 1988, Permacel was acquired by Nitto Denko.

Permacel claims a number of firsts: first masking tape, first filament reinforced tape and patents, first polypropylene tape, first PTFE thread sealant tape, first colored and waterproof cloth tape, and first aluminum foil tape. (Source, corporate literature).

On May 17, 2004, Permacel announced that it would be closing its manufacturing facility in North Brunswick, New Jersey.

On March 31, 2009, Permacel announced that it would be closing its manufacturing facilities in Buena Park, California, and Pleasant Prairie, Wisconsin, by September 30, 2009.
