= David Cook (artist) =

American painter/sculptor/installation artist

- Born: David Wayne Cook; Indianapolis, Indiana, U.S.
- Known for: Painting, Sculpture, Installations
- Movement: Found Object

David Wayne Cook is an American painter, sculptor and installation artist working primarily with found objects. He has also coauthored a book, Lemonade for the Lawnboy, that later became a play. Cook works primarily with found objects - tar, litter, rebar, cement, scrap metal and wire, light fixtures, plaster, shredded tires, mufflers, vines - and occasionally vegetation. He has a warm relationship with Duck Tape because of his use of their product in his flower bombing. He often paints to music, once on public display, and has a series of paintings based on music.

== Career ==
In 1998 David became the featured artist at “Around the Coyote”, a well-known art festival/competition in Chicago. His work was included in the curator's choice in that competition. Around that time, his work was displayed in several galleries in Illinois, including Yello Gallery and Dramaticus Fine Art Gallery .

In addition to painting and sculpture, Cook is known for flower bombing, planting tall flowers constructed from wood, paint and Duck Tape without notification or publicity. He plants the flowers in places where they will bring unexpected joy to passersby, including hospitals and nursing homes.

Cook's art can be seen in a Minneapolis restaurant called Hell's Kitchen and Rosenthal Contemporary Interiors. He did a mural at Theater Latté Da.
