= David Cooke =

David Cooke may refer to:

== Politics ==
- Dave Cooke (born 1952), Canadian NDP politician from Windsor, Ontario
- David R. Cooke (born 1937), Canadian Liberal politician in Ontario
- David O. Cooke (1920–2002), U.S. Department of Defense administrator
- David Cooke (mayor) on list of mayors of Ballarat

== Sports ==
- David Cooke (basketball) (born 1963), American basketball player
- David A. Cooke (born 1949), English rugby union player
- David H. Cooke (born 1955), English rugby union player

== Others ==
- Dave Cooke (businessman) (born c. 1954), founder of charities Operation Christmas Child and Teams4U
- David Cooke (Royal Navy officer) (1955–2014), British admiral
- David Cooke (censor), succeeded Robin Duval at British Board of Film Classification
- David Cooke, voiced Koopalings in the Mario franchise

== See also ==
- David Cook (disambiguation)
- David Coke (pronounced Cook, 1915–1941), British pilot
