= Nitto Denko =

Japanese manufacturing company

Nitto Denko Corporation
- Native name: 日東電工株式会社
- Type: Public (K.K)
- Traded as: TYO: 6988; TOPIX Large 70 Component
- Industry: Chemical
- Founded: Osaki, Tokyo, Japan (October 25, 1918; 107 years ago)
- Headquarters: O-fuka-cho, Kita-ku, Osaka, Japan
- Key people: Hideo Takasaki (Board member and President)
- Products: chemicals and in material science
- Revenue: ¥940,000 million (FY 2023)
- Operating income: ¥106,734 million (FY 2014)
- Net income: ¥77,876 million (FY 2014)
- Total assets: ¥855,433 million (FY 2014)
- Number of employees: 31,997 (FY 2014)
- Website: www.nitto.com

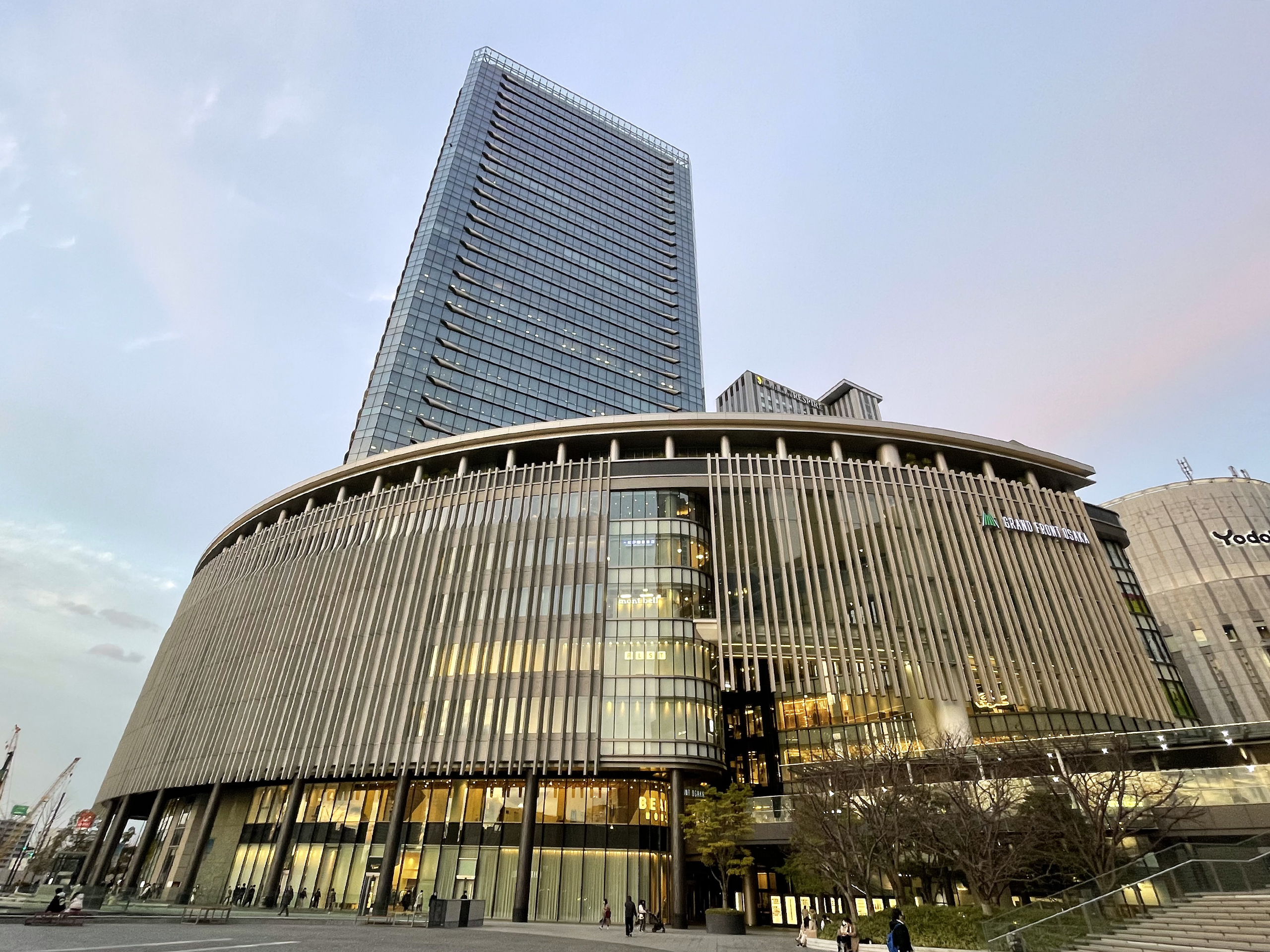
Nitto has its headquarters at the Grand Front Osaka South Building in Kita-ku, Osaka

Nitto Denko Corporation (日東電工株式会社, Nittō Denkō Kabushiki-gaisha) is a Japanese company that produces tapes, vinyl, LCDs, insulation, and several other products. It was founded in Osaki, Tokyo in 1918 to produce electrical insulation and it survived World War II, despite the destruction of its central offices which have since moved to Osaka. Nitto is a member of the Mitsubishi UFJ Financial Group (MUFG) keiretsu.

== History ==
- 1918 Nitto Electric Industrial Company, Limited forms in Ohsaki, Tokyo, to produce electrical insulating materials in Japan.
- 1924 Introduces electrical insulating varnishes.
- 1941 Ibaraki Plant begins operation.
- 1945 Head Office in Osaki, Tokyo, destroyed by air raids.
- 1946
  - Head Office is relocated to Ibaraki, Osaka;
  - Begins production of Black Tape.
- 1949
  - Opens Osaka and Tokyo Branch Offices;
  - Begins production of anticorrosion tapes.
- 1951 Produces first plastic tapes in Japan.
- 1957 Begins production of electrical insulating casting and molding products.
- 1959 Suita Plant begins operation.
- 1961
  - Opens first overseas office in New York;
  - Begins production of fluoroplastic products (NITOFLON);
  - Begins production of surface protection vinyl sheets (SPV).
- 1962
  - Lists common stocks on Second Sections of Tokyo Stock Exchange and Osaka Stock Exchange;
  - Toyohashi Plant begins operation;
- 1964 Begins production of FRP electrical insulating products and double-coated adhesive tape.
- 1966 Begins production of semiconductor encapsulating materials.
- 1967
  - Lists common stocks on First Sections of Tokyo Stock Exchange and Osaka Stock Exchange;
  - Kanto Plant begins operation.
  - Begins production of medical adhesive sheets.
- 1968 Forms Nitto Denko America, Inc..
- 1969
  - Kameyama Plant begins operation;
  - Forms Nitto Denko Taiwan Nitto Denko as the first overseas manufacturing base.
- 1973 Begins production of flexible printed circuits.
- 1974
  - Forms Nitto Belgium N.V.;
  - Begins production of sealing materials (EPT Sealer).
- 1975
  - Forms Nitoms, Inc.;
  - Begins production of polarizing films for liquid crystal displays.
- 1976 Begins production of high-polymer separation membranes (reverse-osmosis membranes, ultrafiltration membranes).
- 1977 Tohoku Plant begins operation.
- 1981 Begins production of tapes for athletes and rehabilitation, taping tapes (NITREAT).
- 1982 Kyushu Plant (now called Nitto Electronics Kyusyu) begins operation.
- 1983 Begins production of transdermal drug delivery patches.
- 1985 Begins production of reinforce and vibration damping materials (NITOHARD).
- 1986 Shiga Plant begins operation.
- 1987 Acquires Hydranautics in the U.S.A.
- 1988 Celebrates 70th anniversary and changes name to Nitto Denko Corporation.
- 1989
  - Begins production of retardation films for liquid crystal displays(NRF);
  - Forms Nitto Denko Electronics (Malaysia) Sdn. Bhd.;
  - Develops plant tissue culture technology (Tissue-cultured Panax Ginseng).
- 1992 Begins production of protective films for painted surface of automobiles.
- 1994 Forms Nitto Denko (Shanghai Pu Dong New Area) Company, Limited
- 1995 Forms Nitto Denko (Shanghai Songjiang) Company, Limited
- 1996
  - Onomichi plant begins operation; Forms Nitto Medical Corporation;
  - Begins production of printed wiring material for HDD (use for wireless suspension);
  - Forms Nitto Lifetec Corporation;
  - Receives Miles prize.
- 1997
  - Forms Nitto Denko Material (Thailand) Company, Limited and P.T. Nitto Materials Indonesia;
  - Forms Nitto Shinko Corporation and Saitama Nitto Denko Corporation.
- 1998 Begins production of Polarization Conversion Films (NIPOCS)
- 1999 Forms Nitto Denko Packaging System Corporation, Nitto Denko Vietnam and Korea Nitto Optical Company, Limited.
- 2000
  - Forms Mie Nitto Denko Corporation, Korea Nitto Denko., Limited;
  - Forms Regional holding company, Nitto America, Inc.;
  - Forms Nitto Denko Himawari Corporation, and Nitto Denko Technical Corporation.
- 2001 Forms Nitto Denko Tape Materials (Vietnam) Company, Limited, Nitto Denko Philippines Corporation and Nittos Denko (Suzhou) Company, Limited
- 2002
  - Forms Nitto Electronics Kyushu Corporation, Aichi Nitto Denko Corporation;
  - Forms Regional holding company, Nitto Denko (China) Investment Company, Limited;
  - Acquires Acoustiseal in the US, and the company changed name to Permacel Automotive Inc..
- 2003
  - Forms Taiwan Nitto Optical Company, Limited.
- 2004
  - Forms Kinovate Life Sciences, Inc. Nitto Denko Packing System is changed name to Nitto Denko CS System Corporation.
  - Forms Nitto Denko (Tianjin) Company, Limited and Nitto Fine Circuit Technology (Shenzhen) Company, Limited.
- 2005
  - Forms Shanghai Nitto Optical Company, Limited;
  - An invention of the method of manufacturing wide-view-angle birefringent film for LCDs receives the Prime Minister Prize.
- 2006 Head Office is relocated to Osaka.
- 2007 Kyoshin Corporation and Nitto Denko Matex Corporation are consolidated into Nitto Denko Corporation.
- 2008
  - High performance reverse osmosis (RO) membrane element for seawater desalination "SWC5" receives 2007 Nikkei Superior Products and Services Awards for Excellence;
  - Forms Nitto Denko Asia Technical Center in Singapore.
- 2009 Forms Nitto Denko India Private, Limited in Manesar, India.
- 2011 Acquires Avecia Biotechnology Inc..
- 2012 Forms Nitto Denko Europe Technical Centre, Lausanne, Switzerland (Closed 2017)
- 2014 Forms Nitto (Qingdao) Technology Research Institute, Co., Ltd.
- 2016 Acquires Irvine Pharmaceutical Services and Avrio Biopharmaceutical
- From 2017, Nitto became the main sponsor of the year-end tennis event ATP Finals in Turin.

== Products ==
- Reverse osmosis membranes for desalination of water, a 4", 8" or 16" diameter elements
- Vertical filter film and horizontal filter film for liquid crystal display
- Products being utilized in various areas of the automotive industry and housing
- Transdermal Therapeutic patches
- Surgical tapes and dressings
- Transparent conductive film and high-clarity optical-use adhesive sheets for touch panel

== Neodymium magnets ==
In August 2015, Nitto Denko announced their development of a new method of sintering neodymium magnet material. The method exploits an "organic/inorganic hybrid technology" to form a clay-like mixture that can be fashioned into various shapes for sintering. Most importantly, it is said to be possible to control a non-uniform orientation of the magnetic field in the sintered material to locally concentrate the field to, e.g., improve the performance of electric motors. Mass production is planned for 2017.

== Sponsorships ==
On 25 May 2017, it was announced that Nitto Denko will be the main sponsor for the ATP Finals, at least until 2020. On 10 September 2020, Nitto Denko announced it will extend its title partnership of the ATP Finals for another five years, until 2025. On 16 November 2025, Nitto Denko announced it will extend its title partnership of the ATP Finals for another five years, until 2030.

== See also ==
- Maxell
- Osaka International Ladies Marathon
