= David Cook (cricketer) =

English cricketer and rugby union footballer

Personal information
- Full name: David Roland Cook
- Born: 2 September 1936; Birmingham, West Midlands, England
- Died: 20 December 2021 (aged 85)
- Batting: Right-handed
- Bowling: Left-arm fast-medium
- Relatives: Michael Cook (brother)

Domestic team information
- Years: Team
- 1962–1968: Warwickshire

Career statistics
Competition	First-class	List A
Matches	9	1
Runs scored	108	3
Batting average	13.50	3.00
100s/50s	0/0	0/0
Top score	28*	3
Balls bowled	1,571	44
Wickets	23	1
Bowling average	23.21	44.00
5 wickets in innings	0	0
10 wickets in match	0	0
Best bowling	4/66	1/44
Catches/stumpings	7/–	1/–
- Source: Cricinfo, 10 May 2012

David Roland Cook (2 September 1936 – 20 December 2021) was an English cricketer. Cook was a right-handed batsman who bowled left-arm fast-medium. He was born at Birmingham, Warwickshire.

Cook made his first-class debut for Warwickshire against Oxford University in 1962. He next appeared for the county in first-class cricket in 1967 against Middlesex in the County Championship. Cook made seven further first-class appearances for the county, the last of which came against Kent in the 1968 County Championship. In his total of nine first-class appearances, he scored 108 runs at an average of 13.50, with a high score of 28*. With the ball, he took 23 wickets at a bowling average of 23.21, with best figures of 4/66. Cook also made a single List A appearance for Warwickshire against Somerset in the 1967 Gillette Cup. His only wicket in the match was that of Mervyn Kitchen, while with the bat he was run out for 3, with Somerset winning by 23 runs.

Cook also played rugby union for Coventry and Warwickshire. His brother, Michael, was also a first-class cricketer.

Cook died on 20 December 2021, at the age of 85.
