= Cellophane =

Thin, transparent sheet made of cellulose

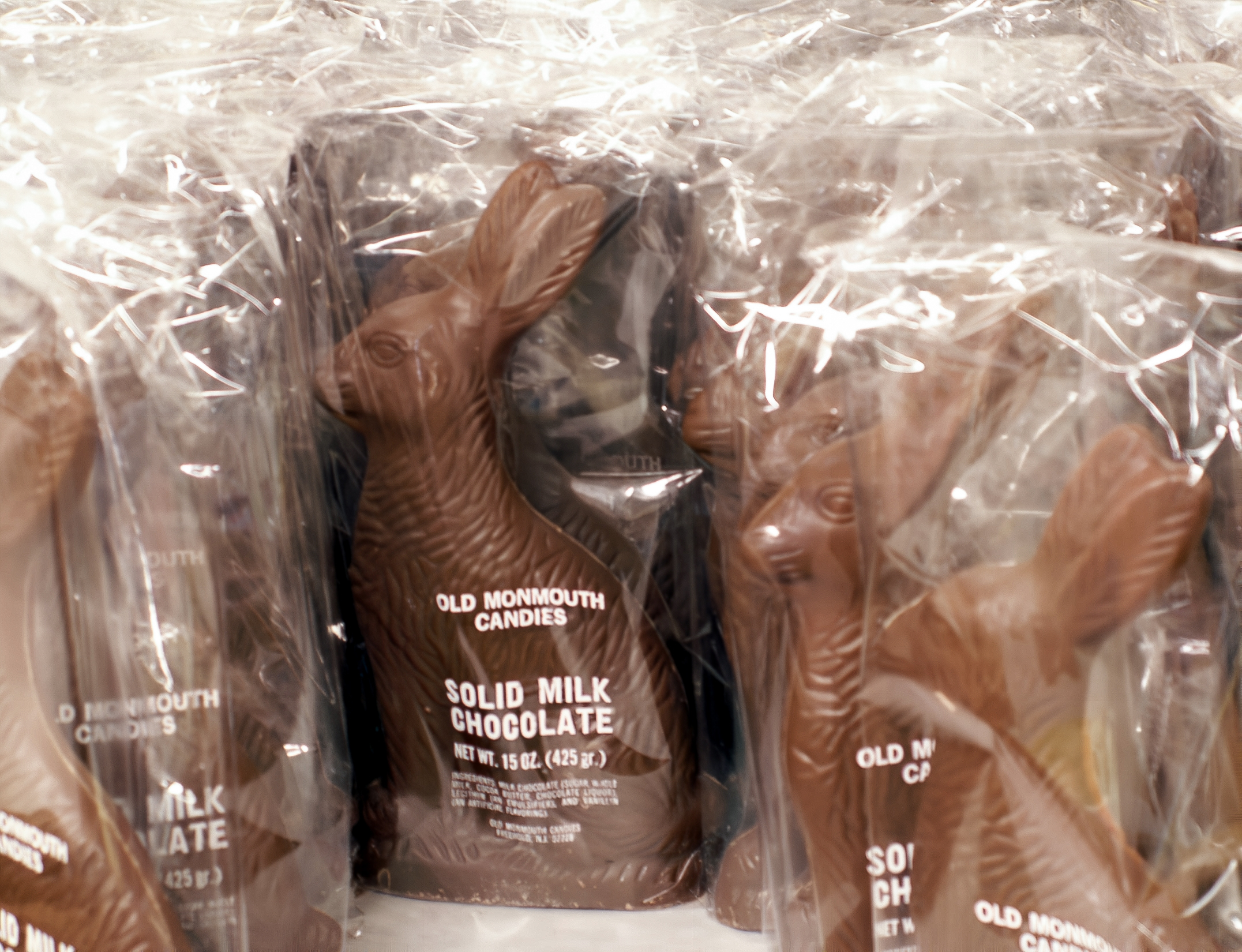
Chocolate rabbits wrapped in cellophane

Cellophane is a thin, transparent sheet made of regenerated cellulose. Its low permeability to air, oils, greases, bacteria, and liquid water makes it useful for food packaging. Cellophane is highly permeable to water vapor, but may be coated with nitrocellulose lacquer to prevent this.

Cellophane is also used in transparent pressure-sensitive tape, tubing, and many other similar applications.

Cellophane is compostable and biodegradable, and can be obtained from biomaterials. The original production process uses carbon disulfide (CS_{2}), which has been found to be highly toxic to workers. The newer lyocell process can be used to produce cellulose film without involving carbon disulfide.

"Cellophane" is a generic term in some countries, while in other countries it is a registered trademark owned by DuPont.

== Production ==
Cellulose is produced from wood, cotton, hemp, and other organic fibres, dissolved in alkali and carbon disulfide to make a solution of liquid viscose. The solution is then extruded through a slit into a bath of dilute sulfuric acid and sodium sulfate to reconvert the viscose into a cellulose film. The film is then passed through a further series of baths; one to remove sulfur, one to bleach the film, and one to add softening materials, such as glycerin, to prevent the film from becoming brittle.

A similar process is used to make rayon fibre, wherein the viscose solution is extruded through a spinneret, to form cellulose filaments, rather than a slit, which forms cellulose film.

Cellophane - like (filamentous) viscose, rayon and cellulose - is a polymer of glucose, insofar as cellophane is structurally different to monomeric glucose, while its chemical composition is the same.

== History ==
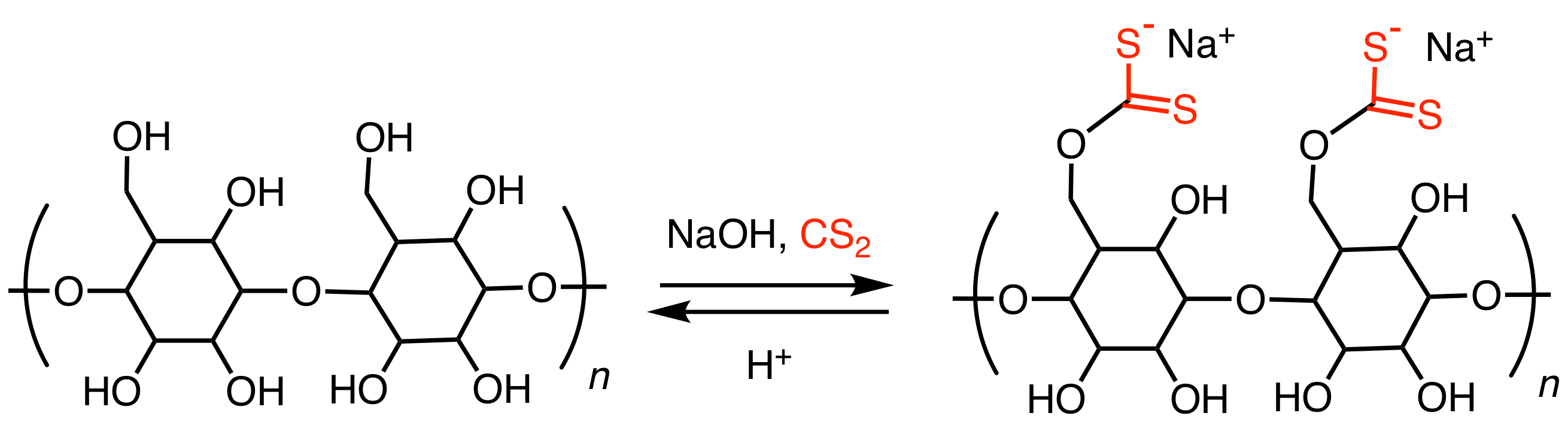
Simplified view of the xanthation of cellulose.

Cellophane was invented by Swiss chemist Jacques E. Brandenberger in 1908, while employed by Blanchisserie et Teinturerie de Thaon. Inspired by the hydrophobic effect of a restaurant tablecloth when wine was spilled on it, Brandenberger aimed to create a material which could repel liquids rather than absorb them. His initial attempt to produce such a material involved spraying a waterproof coating onto viscose cloth. The resulting coated fabric was too stiff, but after drying, the diaphanous cellulose coating could be separated easily from the backing cloth as a flexible and unbroken sheet. Recognising the possibilities of that incidental formation of a structurally-sound transparent material, Brandenberger abandoned his original method.

It took ten years for Brandenberger to perfect his film. His chief improvement of his original cellophane-like film was to add glycerin to soften the material. By 1912, he had constructed a machine to manufacture the film, named "Cellophane"—a portmanteau of cellulose and diaphane ("transparent"). The product film, Cellophane, was patented that year. The following year, Comptoir des Textiles Artificiels (CTA) bought Thaon firm's interest in Cellophane and Brandenberger in a new company, La Cellophane SA.

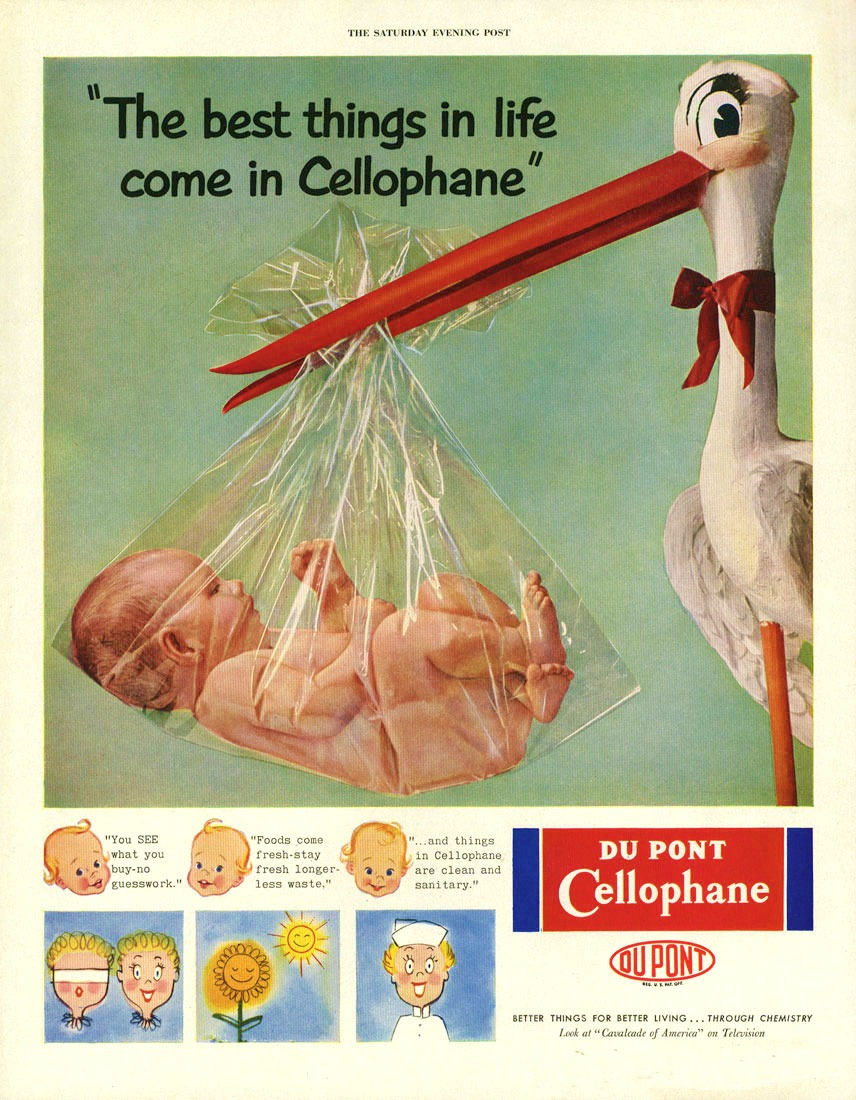
1953 DuPont advert for cellophane

In the United States, Whitman's began using cellophane for its Whitman's Sampler candy wrapping in 1912. Whitman's remained the largest user of imported cellophane from France until nearly 1924, when DuPont built the first cellophane manufacturing plant in the United States. Cellophane saw limited sales in the U.S. at first because, although it was waterproof, it was not moisture-proof; it held or repelled water but was permeable to water vapor. That meant it was unsuitable for packaging products that required moisture-proofing. DuPont hired chemist William Hale Charch (1898–1958), who spent three years developing a nitrocellulose lacquer that, when applied to Cellophane, made it moisture-proof. Following the introduction of moisture-proof Cellophane in 1927, sales tripled between 1928 and 1930 and, in 1938, Cellophane accounted for 10% of DuPont's sales and 25% of its profits.

Cellophane played a crucial role in developing the self-service retailing of fresh meat. Cellophane's transparency helped customers know the quality of meat before buying. Cellophane also worked to consumers' disadvantage when manufacturers learned to manipulate the appearance of a product by controlling oxygen and moisture levels to prevent discolouration of food. It was considered such a useful invention that cellophane was listed alongside other modern marvels in the 1934 song "You're the Top" (from Anything Goes).

The British textile company Courtaulds, diversified its operations in 1930 to include production of a viscose film named "Viscacelle". However, competition with the commercially successful Cellophane hindered sales of Viscacelle. That resulted in the founding of British Cellophane Limited (BCL) in 1935, in conjunction with the Cellophane Company and its French parent company CTA. BCL established a major production facility at Bridgwater, Somerset, between 1935 and 1937, which employed 3,000 workers. Other cellophane production plants were opened at Cornwall, Ontario (BCL Canada), as an adjunct to the existing Courtaulds viscose rayon plant, and from which it bought the viscose solution, and at Barrow-in-Furness, Cumbria. The latter two plants were closed in the 1990s.

== Today ==
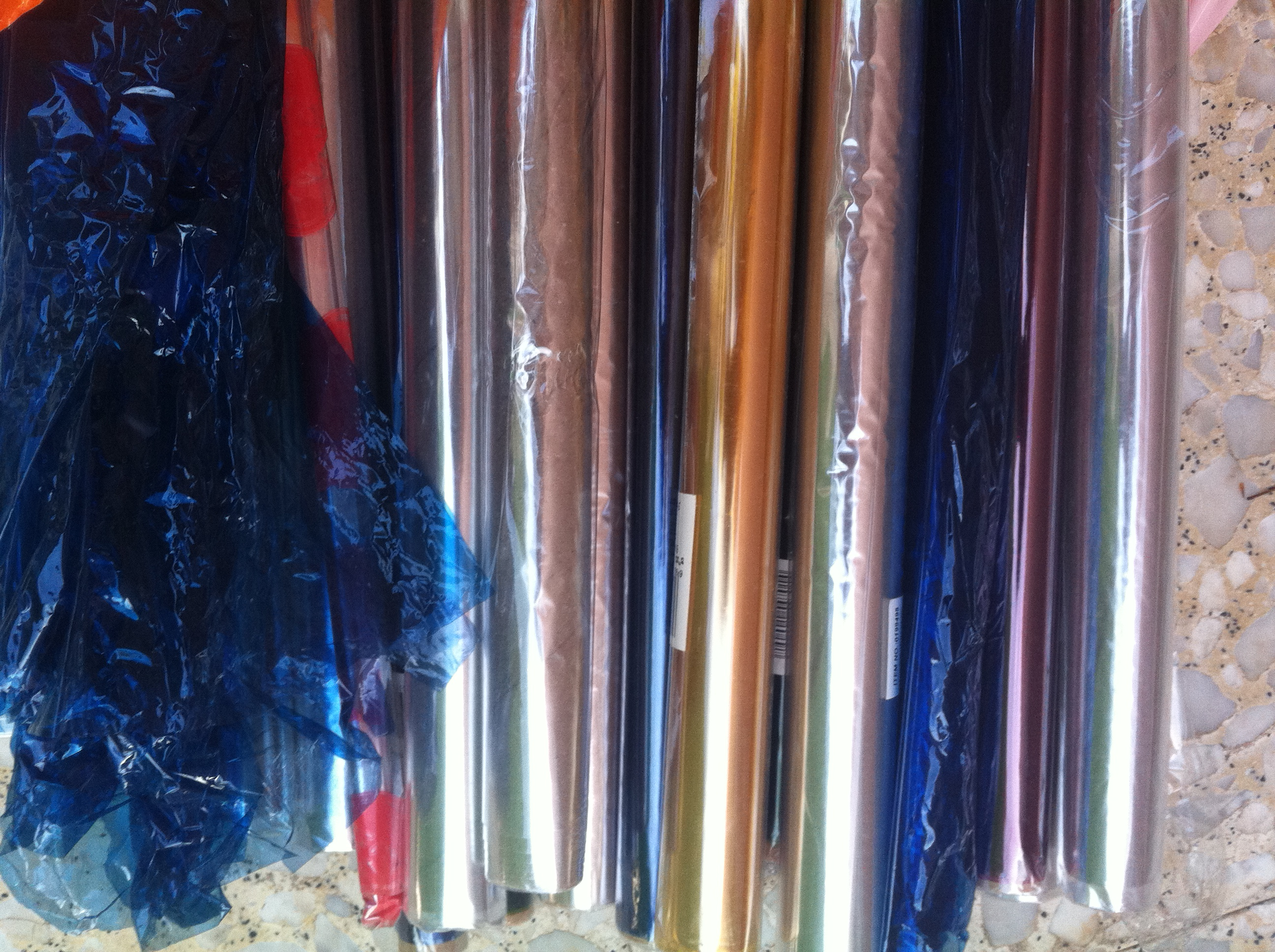
Rolls of cellophane in various colours

Cellulose film has been manufactured continuously since the mid-1930s and is still used today. As well as packaging a variety of food items, there are also industrial applications, such as a base for such self-adhesive tapes as Sellotape and Scotch Tape, a semi-permeable membrane in some alkaline manganese dioxide batteries, as dialysis tubing (Visking tubing), and as a release agent in the manufacture of fibreglass and rubber products. Cellophane is the most popular material for manufacturing cigar packaging; its permeability to water vapor makes cellophane a good product for this application as cigars must be allowed to "breathe" while wrapped and in storage.

Cellophane sales have dwindled since the 1960s, due to alternative packaging options. The polluting effects of carbon disulfide and other by-products of the process used to make viscose may have also contributed to its falling behind lower cost petrochemical-based films such as biaxially-oriented polyethylene terephthalate (BoPET) and biaxially oriented polypropylene (BOPP) in the 1980s and 1990s. However, as of 2017, it has made something of a resurgence in recent times due to its being biosourced, compostable, and biodegradable. Its sustainability record is clouded by its energy-intensive manufacturing process and the potential negative impact of some of the chemicals used, but significant progress in recent years has been made by leading manufacturers in reducing their environmental footprint.

== Material properties ==
When placed between two plane polarizing filters, cellophane produces prismatic colours, due to its birefringent properties. This effect is often used to create stained glass-like effects in kinetic and interactive artworks.

While cellophane is biodegradable, carbon disulfide—used in most cellophane production—is highly toxic. Viscose factories vary widely in the amount of CS_{2} they expose their workers to, and most give no information about their quantitative safety limits or how well they keep to them. The National Institute for Occupational Safety and Health (NIOSH) recommends a short-term exposure limit of 10 ppm.

== Branding ==
In the UK and in many other countries, "Cellophane" is a registered trademark and the property of Futamura Chemical UK Ltd, based in Wigton, Cumbria, England. In the USA and some other countries "cellophane" has become genericized, and is often used informally to refer to a wide variety of plastic film products—even those not made of cellulose—such as PVC-based plastic wrap. Due to this genericization, the more scientifically specific term "cellulose film" is increasingly favored in the industry and in material science to accurately distinguish the original regenerated cellulose product from petrochemical plastics.

== See also ==
- Bioplastics
- British Cellophane
- Genericized trademark
