= Ian Potter (cricketer) =

English cricketer (born 1938)

Personal information
- Full name: Ian Caesar Potter
- Born: 2 September 1938 (age 87); Woking, Surrey
- Batting: Right-handed
- Bowling: Right-arm medium

Domestic team information
- Years: Team
- 1959–1961: Kent
- 1960–1962: Oxford University
- Source: Cricinfo, 5 April 2014

Ian Caesar Potter (born 2 September 1938) is a former English cricketer. He played for Kent County Cricket Club and Oxford University between 1959 and 1962.

Potter was born at Woking in Surrey in 1938. He was educated at The King's School, Canterbury where he played cricket in the school XI, appearing for Southern School and Public Schools teams at Lord's in 1957.

Potter, who played primarily as a bowler, made this first-class debut for Kent in 1959, playing against Cambridge University. He played most of his first-class cricket for Oxford, making 16 appearances for the team between 1960 and 1962, including playing in two University Matches and winning cricket Blues in 1961 and 1962. He played two County Championship matches for Kent in 1961, but did not play first-class cricket after leaving university. He played 26 times for Kent's Second XI between 1959 and 1962 and won a hockey Blue for Oxford.

Potter graduated from Oxford with a BA in Zoology in 1962, before moving to Australia. He completed a PhD thesis studying the biology of lampreys in 1968 at the University of New South Wales, before working at Duke University in the United States and conducting research at the University of Bath in the UK, where he was later appointed as a lecturer. In 1976 he moved to Murdoch University in Australia, becoming the inaugural Professor of Animal Biology, later becoming a Research Professor.
