= Shurtape Technologies =

American manufacturing company

Shurtape Technologies, LLC
- Type: Private
- Industry: Manufacturing
- Founded: 1996
- Founders: Shuford family
- Headquarters: Hickory, North Carolina, U.S.
- Area served: North America, Europe
- Key people: Jim Shuford (CEO/President); Wayne Helton (Senior Vice President of manufacturing); Stephen Shuford (Executive Vice President); A. P. Shuford (Chairman of the board of directors)
- Products: Adhesive tape; Consumer goods; Office supplies
- Brands: Duck Tape; FrogTape; Kip; Painter's Mate; Shurtape Brand; T-Rex Tape
- Revenue: $650 million (2017)
- Owners: Shuford family
- Number of employees: 1,500 (2017)
- Parent: STM Industries
- Subsidiaries: ShurTech Brands; Engineered Solutions Group
- Website: shurtapetech.com

Shurtape Technologies, LLC is an American manufacturing company that produces adhesive tape as well as consumer goods and office supplies, recognizable as the manufacturer of the Duck Tape and Frog Tape brands. Founded in 1996, Shurtape had its origins as the tape division of Shuford Mills, a textile manufacturing company; Shurtape was spun off from the textile division after it began to outpace it in revenue. Today, both Shurtape and the remaining textile business are subsidiaries of STM Industries. The company is owned and operated by the Shuford family, with brothers Jim and Stephen as CEO and Executive Vice President, respectively.

Shurtape operates 13 manufacturing facilities worldwide and employs around 1,500 people. Its corporate headquarters is based in Hickory, North Carolina, and its subsidiaries ShurTech Brands and the Engineered Solutions Group are headquartered in Avon, Ohio and New Hartford, Connecticut, respectively.

== History ==
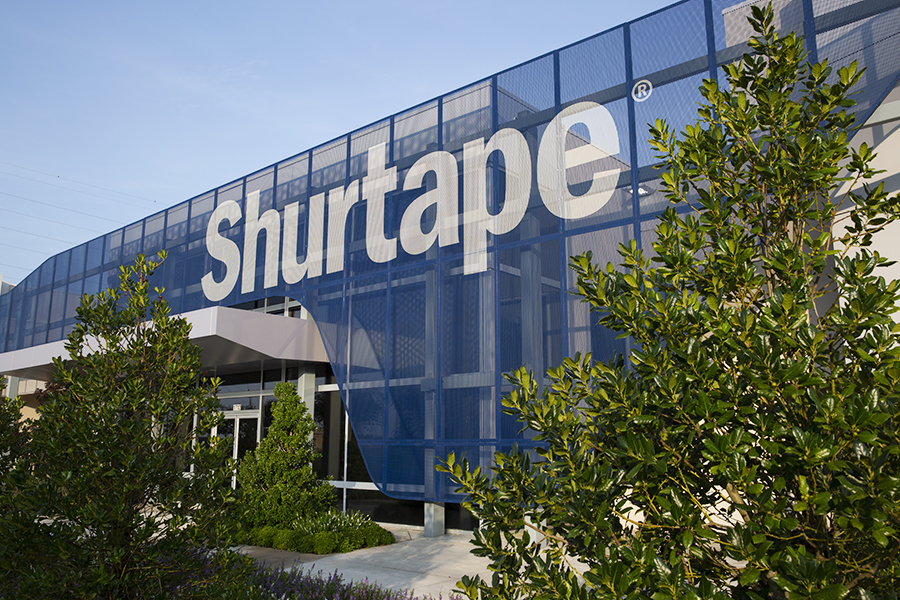
Shurtape's corporate headquarters in Hickory, North Carolina

Shurtape originated from Shuford Mills, a textile company that was founded in Granite Falls, North Carolina in 1880 by Abel Alexander Shuford. In 1955, Shuford Mills launched a tape division focusing on masking tape. Originally only a small section in the main Shuford Mills factory in Hickory, North Carolina, the tape division grew to have a factory of its own. The tape division later went on to expand to additional types of tape and an additional factory. In 1996, Shuford Mills decided to split off its tape division into a separate company, Shurtape Technologies, LLC. Both Shurtape and the remaining textile business were then placed under a holding company, STM Industries; by this point, the tape business was making nearly twice as much as the textile business.

The company opened a plant in nearby Hudson, North Carolina in 1997, and in 1999 they announced a plan to expand their Hickory plant by 40,000 square feet (3,700 m^{2}). This was completed in 2000 along with a converting facility in Singapore. A new distribution center in Catawba, North Carolina was opened in 2004. The company also purchased overseas facilities in the late 1990s in countries like China and Mexico. Shurtape purchased Permacel's arts and entertainment division in 2004.

Shurtape saw a decline in sales during the Great Recession; the company experienced a 20% decline in sales which resulted in a brief layoff pattern. After Henkel put Manco Inc., Shurtape's largest customer, up for sale in 2009, Shurtape decided to buy the company to retain the estimated $75 million in business. This deal included the Duck Tape, Painter's Mate, and Easy Liner brands along with a manufacturing plant in Avon, Ohio. These brands were consolidated into a new subsidiary, ShurTech Brands, LLC, and the plant has since been remodeled into the headquarters for ShurTech. Shurtape also purchased the FrogTape brand in 2010. The company's total revenue doubled from $275 million in 2008 to $650 million in 2017. Shurtape acquired Syntac Coated Products, LLC in 2017 and also invested in and partnered with InRoad, a toy company that produces adhesive road-styled tape for children. In December 2018, Shurtape announced plans to build a new distribution and manufacturing center in Catawba. Shurtape plans to invest $31 million into the project. The company remains a major economic player in the Hickory metro area, which has lost a fifth of its manufacturing jobs since 2007, and ranks as the sixth-largest manufacturer in the city of Hickory.

== Business and executives ==
Shurtape headquarters locations

Shurtape Technologies, LLC's corporate and industrial headquarters is located in Hickory, North Carolina. ShurTech Brands and Shurtape Speciality Coating are headquartered in Avon, Ohio and New Hartford, Connecticut. The company has 13 facilities, with locations in the United States as well as Canada, China, Germany, Mexico, Peru, the United Kingdom, and the United Arab Emirates. As of 2017, Shurtape has around 1,500 employees.

Shurtape is owned by the Shuford family. The Shufords have been involved in business in Hickory since 1880, when Abel Alexander Shuford built the first yarn factory in what would become Shuford Mills.

== Products and manufacturing ==
Shurtape Technologies, LLC produces more than 650 types of adhesive tape marketed to multiple different industries, including painting, construction, HVAC, and packaging; according to Business North Carolina, the company produced 733,000,000 square feet (68,100,000 m^{2}) of tape in 2016 and ranks second in consumer tape sales behind 3M.

=== Engineered Solutions Group ===
The Engineered Solutions Group consists of Shurtape Specialty Coating and Shurmed. Shurtape Speciality Coating produces speciality, custom-made adhesive tapes for industries like construction and electronics and Shurmed produces pressure-sensitive adhesive products for the healthcare and medical device industries. Shurtape Specialty Coating and Shurmed were both part of Syntac Coated Products, LLC prior to being acquired by Shurtape.

=== Kip ===
Kip is a distributor based in Germany. Kip was acquired by Shurtape in 2000 and now operates as a subsidiary. its products include adhesive tape, painter's tape, plastering tape, construction adhesives, and construction industry supplies.

=== ShurTech Brands ===
Duck Brand is known for its Duck Tape product line, which is produced in hundreds of colors and patterns. Duck Tape is marketed at a broad audience ranging from causal crafters to DIYers. FrogTape and Painter's Mate both sell painter's tape; FrogTape painter's tape is similar to other tapes, but utilizes a coating to seal the edges of the tape for cleaner lines. T-Rex tape is designed to be more durable and weather-resistant than ordinary duct tapes.

Shurtape Brand focuses on industries like HVAC, packaging, and painting. Shurtape purchased Permacel's arts and entertainments division in 2004; Permacel was known for its gaffer tape brand Permacel P-665, which was commonly used in Hollywood productions. Shurtape has since renamed the brand Shurtape P-665. Shurtape sells a case sealing system, the ShurSEAL Solution, which creates a packaging seal that doesn't require a knife to open.

== Community ==
=== Tape University ===
Shurtape operates Tape University, an online resource aimed at educating people about tape and answering frequently asked questions about tape. Tape University manages the annual Mission: HVAC program, which aims to promote education in the HVAC industry. Three participants from trade schools across the United States are chosen and assigned 10 HVAC-theme missions. After completing the missions, each participant is awarded a $5,000 reward to help pay for their education. This program was expanded for 2019 to include a separate trade school award as well, with two trade schools or technical programs being awarded a separate $5,000 award. They also offered Mission: Packaging, a similar program aimed at packaging students.

Tape University provided a $2,500 scholarship to an attendee of the 2018 Sachse Construction Academy, an event for high school students in the Metro Detroit area.
