= Masking tape =

Pressure sensitive tape made of paper

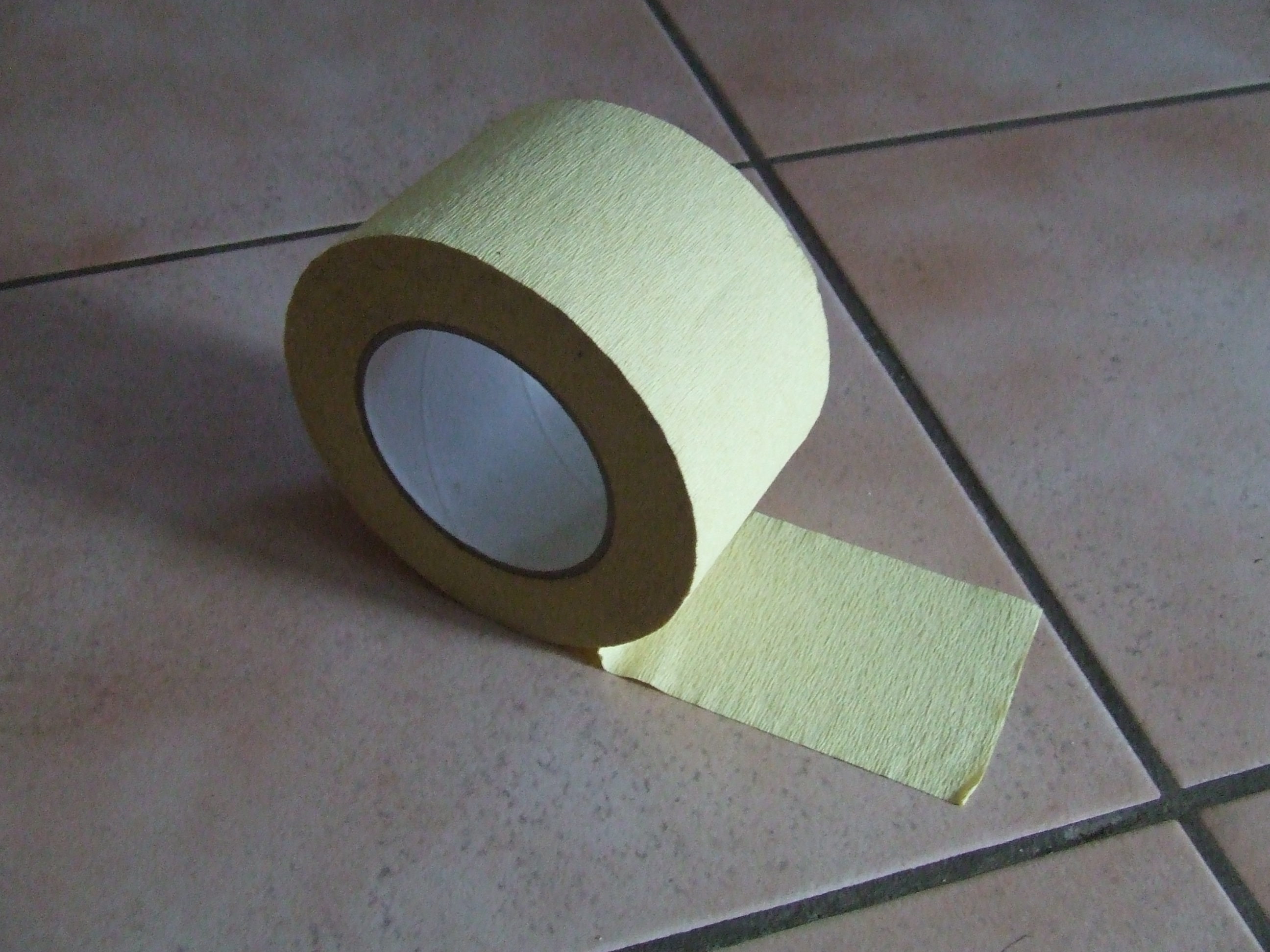
Masking tape

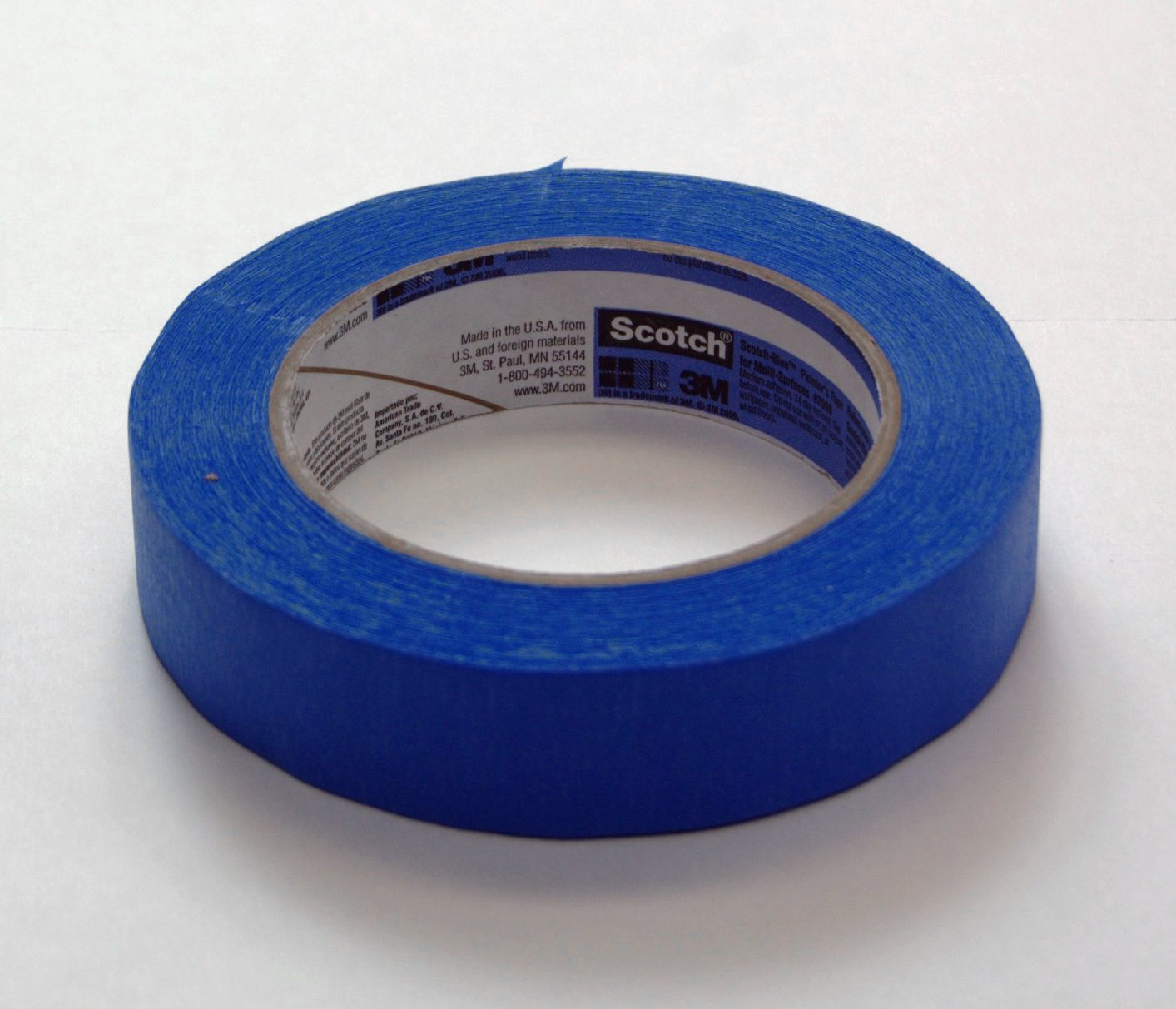
Painter's tape, a type of masking tape typically used to ensure clean edges on wall painting.

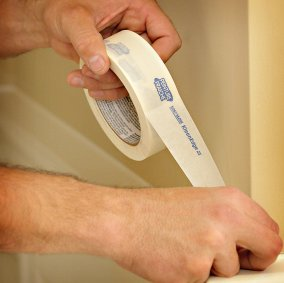
A low tack masking tape.

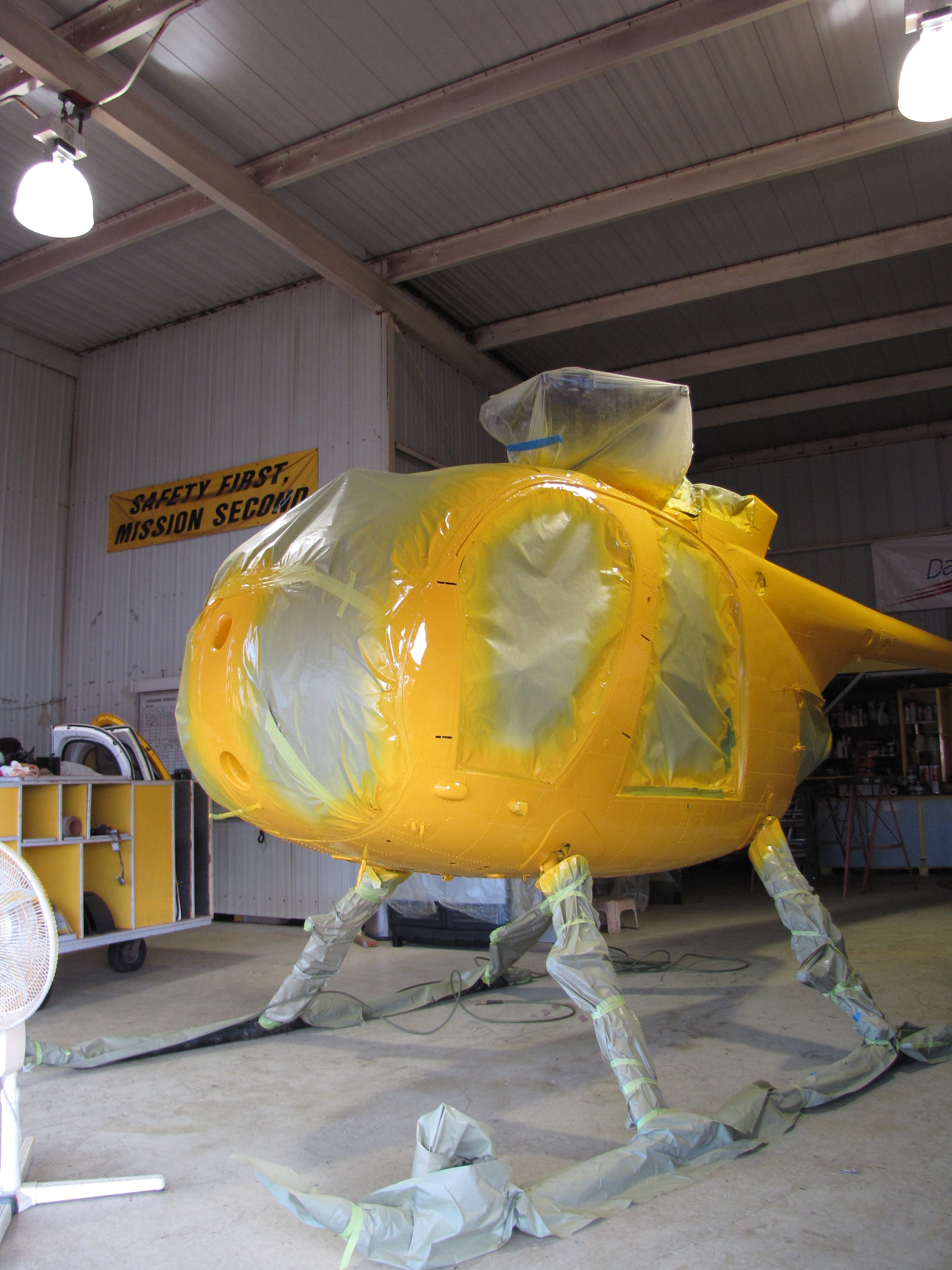
Masking tape used on a helicopter

Masking tape, also known as painter's tape, is a type of pressure-sensitive tape made of a thin and easy-to-tear paper, and an easily released pressure-sensitive adhesive. It is available in a variety of widths. It is used mainly in painting, to mask off areas that should not be painted.

Some inexpensive masking tapes are suited for general use in homes and offices. Others are designed for professional house painters. Masking tapes for automotive or aircraft use have special characteristics for these demanding applications.

== History ==
Masking tape was created in 1925 by 3M employee Richard Gurley Drew. Drew observed autobody workers growing frustrated when they removed butcher paper they had taped to cars they were painting. The strong adhesive on the tape peeled off some of the paint they had just applied. Touching up the damaged areas increased their costs. Drew realized the need for tape with a gentler adhesive.

== Constructions ==
Several constructions of masking tapes have been developed. Many are designed for a specific purpose.

The backing of masking tape is typically paper, although plastic films and metal foils have also been used. Most papers are creped (rather than flat) to allow the tape to stretch when applied to a curved line. Tapes can be natural paper (beige) or different colors. Paper backings are often saturated with resins to help prevent paint from seeping through the paper. Many tapes have a release coating on the top of the tape to help the tape release from the roll.

The pressure sensitive adhesive on masking tapes need to create an effective bond to the intended surface, particularly on the edges to prevent paint from working in and causing a rough paint line. Once the paint is dry, the adhesive must also release cleanly from the surface without damaging the surface or leaving residue.

Most masking tapes are designed for temporary use at ambient temperatures. When needed, special tapes are available for longer term usage, higher temperatures, chemical washes, sunlight, etc.

== Usage ==
For its original use of marking off areas where paint is not desired, a special grade of painter's masking tape is needed. With this special grade, very clean lines can be produced. Without it, the paint bleeds under the edges of the tape, producing a fuzzy or varied line.

Drafting tape looks similar to ordinary household masking tape, but has a lower tack. It is intended to hold blueprints to a drawing board or light table, and to pull off easily without damaging the drawing.

Masking tape is also used in long strips on larger glass panes in situations where the glass might be shattered, harming those in the vicinity.

== Other types ==
When constructed with plastic films instead of paper, masking tapes can be used for more rigorous applications. Polyester-based tapes are used to mask off during etching, plating, and in particular, powder coating. Tapes based on polyimide films can resist molten solder in electronics applications. Glass cloth tapes are often used in powder coating and sandblasting operations. Foil or vinyl tapes are often used in plating. Layered tapes made from multiple materials laminated together can be used for masking flame spray, thermal spray and HVOF. Masking tape can also be used to adhere posters to walls up to the day rating. Masking tape can basically be used for any purpose required of it, and is not limited solely to painting needs.

The adhesive applied to a tape is often a critical determining factor for a given masking situation. There are three thin types of adhesives (with many chemical variations of each): rubber-based, acrylic-based, and silicone-based. Rubber-based adhesives generally provide the greatest adhesion, but the lowest temperature resistance. Acrylic-based adhesives offer a wide temperature range, providing adhesion from sub-freezing temperatures up to 275–325 °F (about 150 °C). Silicone-based adhesives provide the highest temperature resistance, with some tapes (such as some polyimide films and glass cloth tapes) allowing for intermittent use up to 500 °F (260 °C).

== See also ==
- Adhesive tape
- Chemistry of adhesive tapes
- List of adhesive tapes
