= Aluminium foil =

Thin, flexible sheet of aluminium

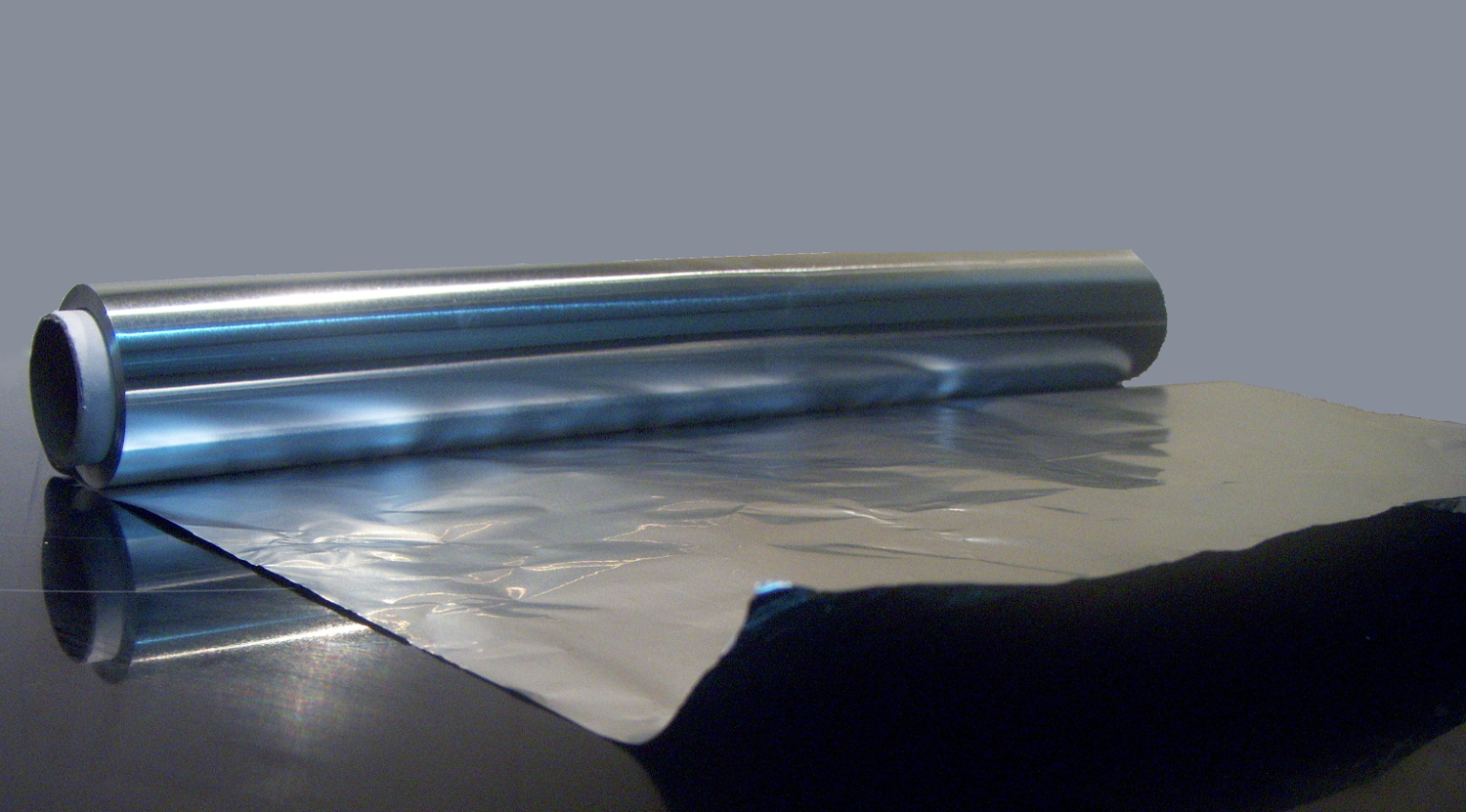
A roll of aluminium foil

Aluminium foil (or aluminum foil in American English; also called tinfoil) is aluminium prepared in thin metal leaves. The foil is pliable and can be readily bent or wrapped around objects. Thin foils are fragile and are sometimes laminated with other materials such as plastics or paper to make them stronger and more useful.

Annual production of aluminium foil was approximately 850,000 tonnes (940,000 tons) in Europe in 2014, and 600,000 tonnes (660,000 tons) in the U.S. in 2003. Approximately 75% of aluminium foil is used for packaging of foods, cosmetics, and chemical products, and 25% is used for industrial applications (e.g., thermal insulation, electrical cables, and electronics). It can be easily recycled.

Aluminium foil supplanted tin foil in the mid-20th century. In the United Kingdom and United States it is often informally called "tin foil", just as steel cans are often still called "tin cans". Metallised films are sometimes mistaken for aluminium foil, but are actually polymer films coated with a thin layer of aluminium.

== History ==
=== Precursors ===
Foil made from a thin leaf of tin was commercially available before its aluminium counterpart. Tin foil was marketed commercially from the late nineteenth into the early twentieth century. The term "tin foil" survives in the English language as a term for the newer aluminium foil. Tin foil is less malleable than aluminium foil and tends to give a slight tin taste to food wrapped in it. Tin foil has been supplanted by aluminium and other materials for wrapping food. The first audio recordings on phonograph cylinders were made on tin foil.

=== Invention ===
Tin was first replaced by aluminium in 1910, when the first aluminium foil rolling plant, Dr. Lauber, Neher & Cie. was opened in Emmishofen, Switzerland. The plant, owned by J. G. Neher & Sons, the aluminium manufacturers, was founded in 1886 in Schaffhausen, Switzerland, at the foot of the Rhine Falls, whose energy powered the process. In December 1907, Neher's sons, along with Dr. Lauber, had invented the endless rolling process, by which they discovered that aluminium foil could be used as a protective barrier. Bern-based Tobler began wrapping its chocolate bars in aluminium foil in 1911, including the unique triangular chocolate bar, Toblerone.

== Properties ==
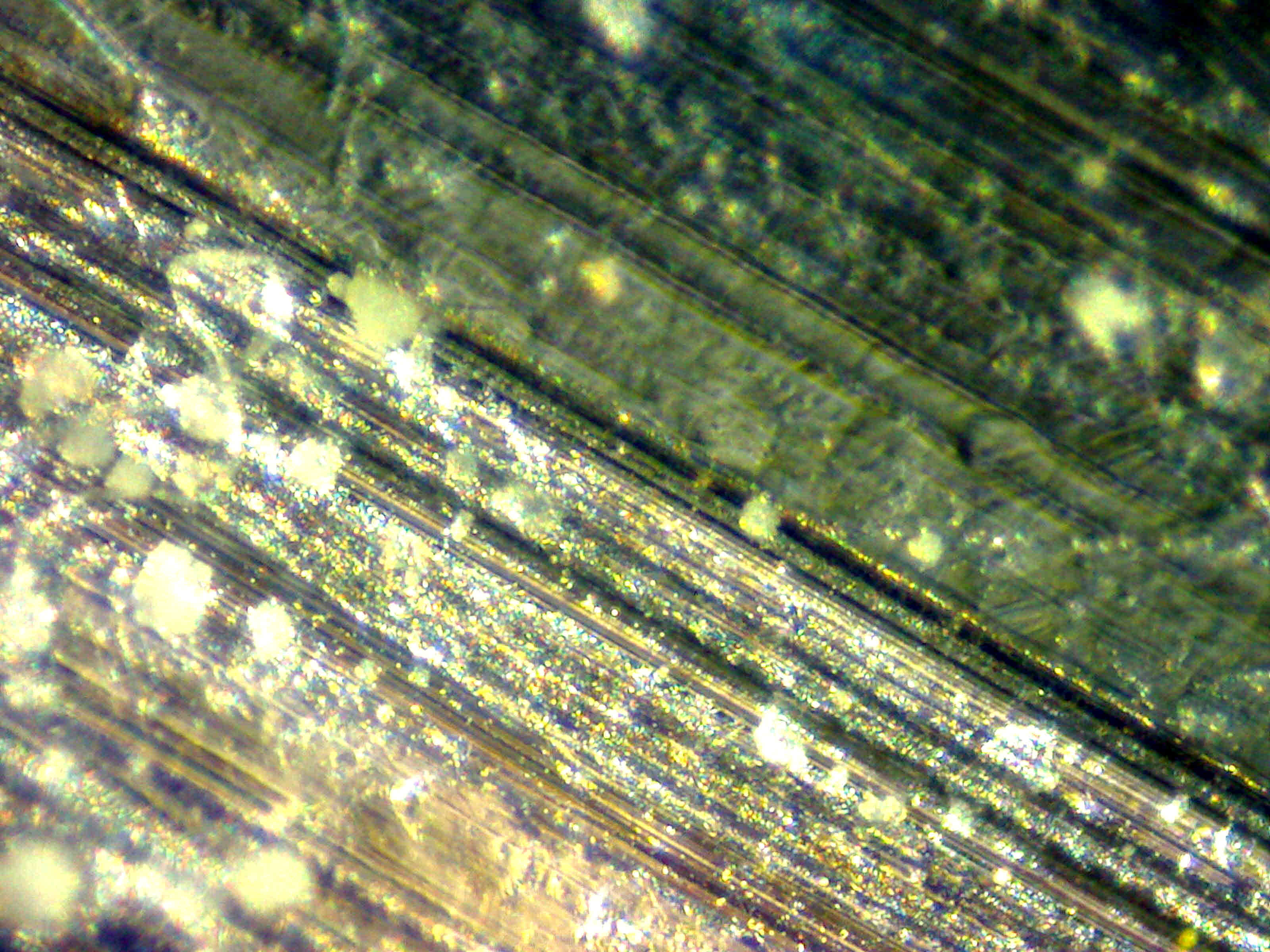
Microscopic close-up of aluminium foil on the back of an intumescent rubber strip

Aluminium foil has a thickness less than 0.2 mm (7.9 mils); thinner gauges down to 6 μm (0.24 mils) are also commonly used. Standard household foil is typically 0.016 mm (0.63 mils) thick, and heavy-duty household foil is typically 0.024 mm (0.94 mils). Foil may have a non-stick coating on only one side.

Although aluminium is non-magnetic, it is a good conductor, so even a thin sheet reflects almost all of an incident electric wave. At frequencies more than 100 MHz, the transmitted electric field is attenuated by more than 80 decibels (dB), that is less than 10^{−8} = 0.00000001 of the power gets through. Thin sheets of aluminium are not very effective at attenuating low-frequency magnetic fields. The shielding effectiveness is dependent upon the skin depth. A field travelling through one skin depth will lose about 63% of its energy (it is attenuated to 1/e = 1/2.718... of its original energy). Thin shields also have internal reflections that reduce the shielding effectiveness.

== Manufacture ==
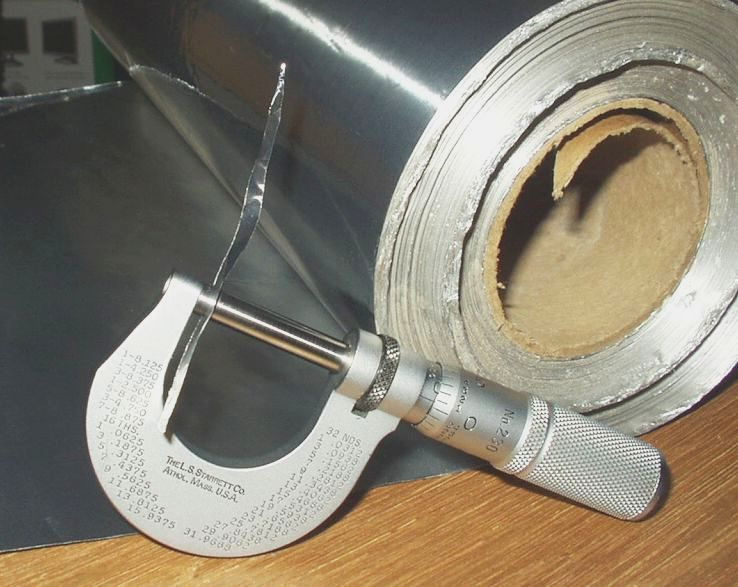
A roll of aluminium foil, with micrometer showing a thickness of 13 μm (0.5 mils)

The continuous casting method is much less energy-intensive and has become the preferred process. It is difficult to produce rollers with a gap fine enough to cope with the foil gauge, and to avoid this, as well as reducing tearing, increasing production rates, and controlling thickness, for the final pass when producing thicknesses below 0.025 mm (1 mil), two sheets are rolled at the same time, doubling the thickness of the gauge at entry to the rollers. After the rollers, the two sheets are separated, which produces foil with one shiny side and one matte side.

The two sides in contact with each other are matte, and the exterior sides become shiny. The difference in thermal properties between the two sides is imperceptible without instrumentation. By Kirchhoff's law of radiation, increased reflectivity decreases both absorption and emission of radiation.

== Uses ==
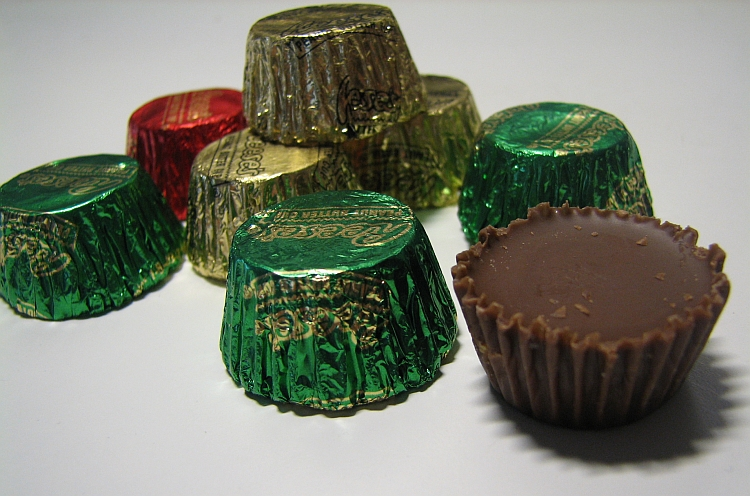
Candies in aluminium foil packaging

Aluminium foil is widely sold into the consumer market, such as for wrapping leftovers to be stored in a refrigerator or barbecuing delicate foods.

As with all metallic items, it reacts to being placed in a microwave oven. This is because of the electromagnetic fields of the microwaves inducing electric currents in the foil and high potentials at the sharp points of the foil sheet; if the potential is sufficiently high, it will cause electric arcing to areas with lower potential, even to the air surrounding the sheet. Modern microwave ovens have been designed to prevent damage to the cavity magnetron tube from microwave energy reflection, and aluminium packages designed for microwave heating are available.

Submerged in a baking soda solution, it can be used to polish metals such as silver and gold via electrolytic cleaning, as it is a more reactive metal than either. A similar method can be used to produce silver substrates for Raman spectrography.

== Environmental issues ==
Some aluminium foil products can be recycled at around 5% of the original energy cost.

== See also ==
- Copper foil
- Gold leaf
- Plastic wrap
- Sheet metal
- Tin foil hat
- Wax paper
- Tea lead
