= Foil (metal) =

Thin sheet of metal

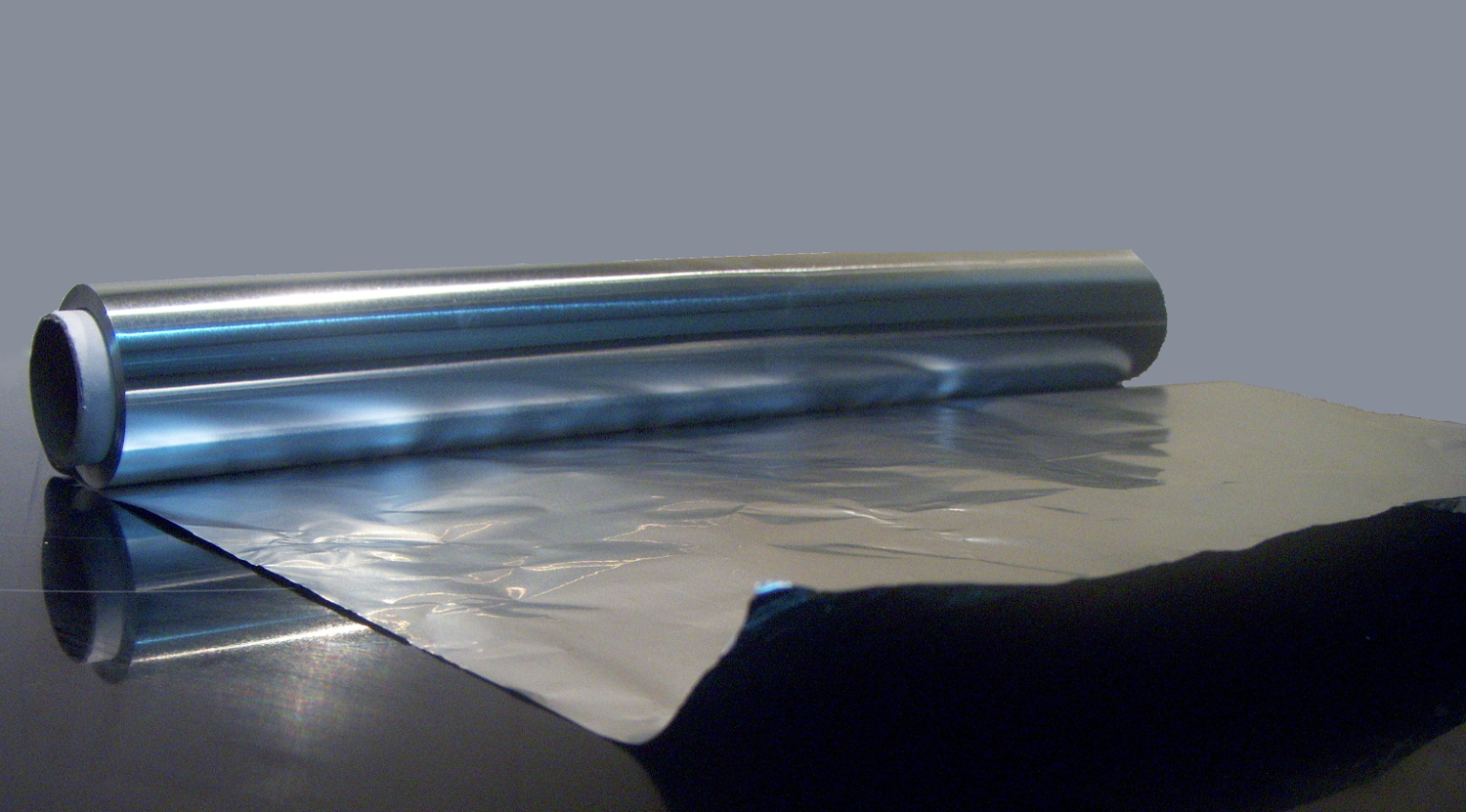
A roll of aluminium foil

A foil is a very thin sheet of metal, typically made by hammering or rolling. Foils are most easily made with malleable metal, such as aluminium, copper, tin, and gold. Foils usually bend under their own weight and can be torn easily. For example, aluminium foil is usually about 1/1000 inch (0.025 mm), whereas gold (more malleable than aluminium) can be made into foil only a few atoms thick, called gold leaf. Extremely thin foil is called metal leaf. Leaf tears very easily and must be picked up with special brushes.

== See also ==
- Aluminium foil
- Copper foil
- Tin foil
- Gold leaf
- Metal leaf
