= Copper tape =

Thin strip of copper backed with adhesive

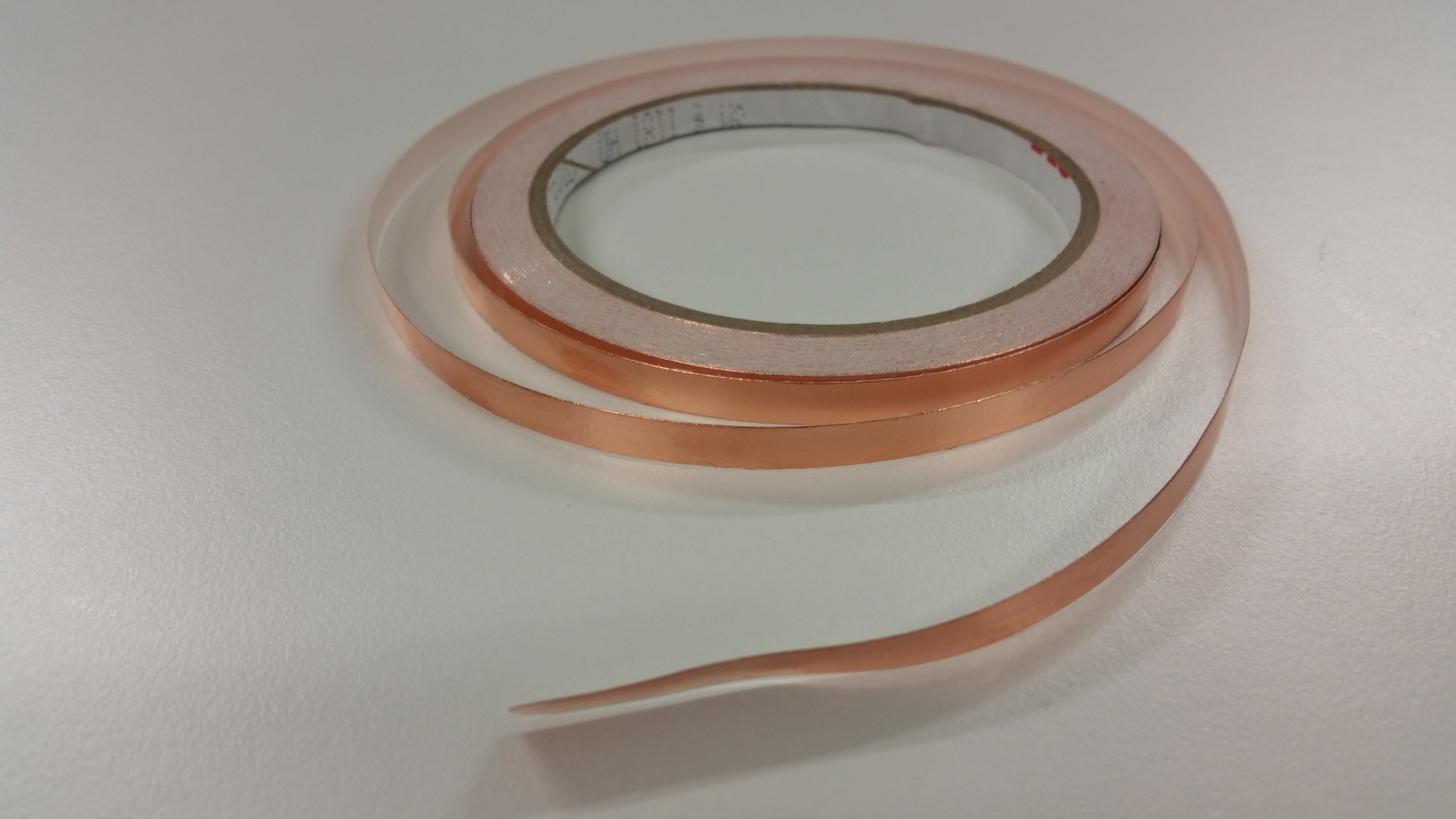
5mm adhesive-backed copper tape

Copper tape refers to a thin strip of copper, often backed with adhesive.

== Uses ==
Copper tape can be found at most hardware and gardening stores, and sometimes electronic stores. Copper tape is used to keep slugs and snails out of certain areas in gardens, potted plants, and trunks of fruit trees, and other trees and shrubs. It is also used for other applications, such as electromagnetic shielding or low-profile surface mount transmission line in electronics and in the production of tiffany lamps. It comes in two forms; conductive adhesive and non-conductive adhesive (which is more common). It is used for the heat transfer in computers. It is used for stained glass.

== See also ==
- Copper foil
- Metal tape
