= Copper foil =

Thin, flexible sheet of metal

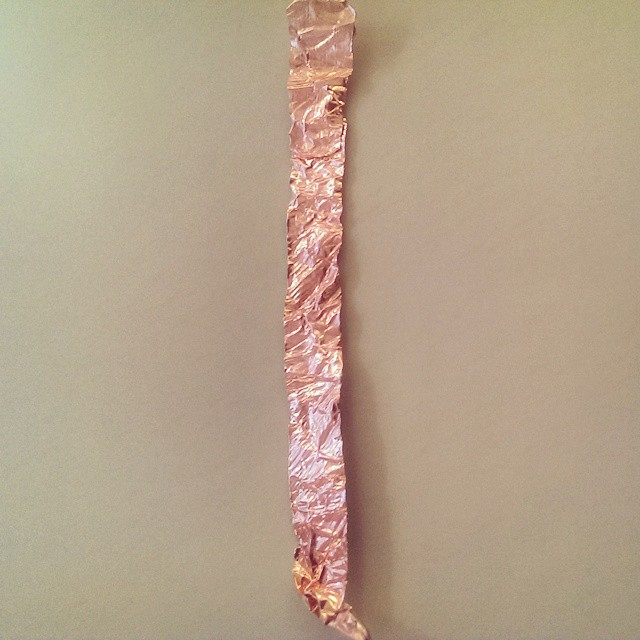
Copper foil

Copper foil is a thin sheet of copper metal that is widely used in various applications due to its excellent electrical conductivity, malleability, and corrosion resistance. It is an essential material in the electronics industry, especially for manufacturing printed circuit boards (PCBs) and other electronic components.

== Manufacturing process ==
The manufacturing of copper foil involves several steps, including casting, rolling, annealing, and finishing. The process starts with molten copper being cast into large slabs, which are then rolled down to the desired thickness. During the rolling process, the copper undergoes annealing, a heat treatment that improves its flexibility and removes any internal stresses.

Once the copper reaches the desired thickness, it is further processed to achieve specific surface qualities, such as matte, half-matte, or shiny finishes. The finished copper foil is then spooled into rolls of varying widths and lengths, depending on the intended application.

== Types ==
Copper foil is available in different types to suit various applications. Electrodeposited (or electrolytic) is produced by electroplating copper onto a rolling drum in a highly controlled manner. This type of copper foil has uniform thickness and excellent electrical conductivity, making it ideal for high-performance electronic applications. Rolled annealed is produced through a rolling and annealing process, as described earlier. It offers good flexibility and is commonly used in flexible printed circuit boards and other applications where flexibility is required. High-temperature rolled annealed undergoes additional heat treatment to enhance its resistance to high temperatures. This type of copper foil is used in applications that involve exposure to elevated temperatures. Ultra-thin is an extremely thin variant used in specialized applications where space is limited, such as in RFID tags and smart cards.

== Applications ==
Copper foil has a wide range of applications, with its primary use being in the electronics industry. It is a crucial component in the manufacturing of printed circuit boards, which are the building blocks of electronic devices. It is used to create conductive traces and interconnections on the insulating substrate, allowing the flow of electrical signals between different components. Another use is in lithium-ion batteries as a current collector. It enhances the battery's performance by providing a conductive pathway for the flow of electrons during charging and discharging processes. Due to its high electrical conductivity, copper foil is employed for electromagnetic shielding in various electronic devices. It helps prevent electromagnetic interference and radio frequency interference to ensure proper device operation. It is also used to wind electrical transformers due to its low electrical resistance, ensuring efficient power transmission and minimizing energy loss. In artistic applications, it is used in stained glass artwork to join individual glass pieces together, providing structural support and creating decorative elements.

== See also ==
- Aluminium foil
- Copper tape
- Gold leaf
- Metal leaf
- Tin foil
