= Tea lead =

Forgotten commodity

Chinese craftsmen making tea lead according to the traditional process (early 19th century aquatint: Wellcome Collection)

Tea lead was a wrapping material used before aluminium foil. It was made of lead alloyed with a little tin. The product originated in China, where it was cast by skilled craftsmen in paper-thin sheets, and used for hermetically sealing chests of tea.

The tea chests were exported to the West in such numbers that they were an important source of lead. 'Tea lead' was a recognised metal designation with published market prices. Of high quality, it was melted down for making lead pipes (including gas pipes and organ pipes), printer's type, solder and ammunition. Pieces of the original tea lead were readily obtainable from local storekeepers and were repurposed as bandages, dental fillings, hair curlers, and other useful objects.

Consumer branding arose when John Horniman (1826) realised he should supply his tea in small, pre-weighed quantities enclosed in tamper-proof packets bearing his signature. Sealed with tea lead, they tackled the widespread practices of food adulteration and weight fraud. In time lead foil packaging spread to other consumer products such as coffee, tobacco, sweets, chewing gum and flowers.

In the 19th century British manufacturers developed methods of making tea lead cheaply by machine, and exported it to the tea industries of Asia, including China. Material commonly described as silver paper (as collected by children), tin foil or tinsel was really lead, or mainly so. Tea lead was still being quoted daily on the New York Metal Exchange in the 1920s. American cigarettes were sold wrapped in lead foil until 1942 when, owing to wartime scarcity, packaging of consumer products in lead foil was forbidden. After the war lead foil wrapping never recovered its position. Concerns about toxicity helped to ensure its demise.

== Phrase: early uses ==
Both the Dutch East India Company and the British East India Company imported tea from China, and already by 1728 Dutch traders were packing their tea in chests lined with lead foil, which they called theelood; an English-Dutch dictionary of 1800 has the term in both languages.

=== British Isles ===
Dublin Courier, 5 February 1762. The buyer was a type foundry and was not interested in small quantities.

The earliest recorded use of the phrase "tea lead" (Note: Tea-lead is a variant spelling, favoured by the Oxford English Dictionary, but most of the sources cited in this article omit the hyphen.) occurs in the latter decades of the 18th century. (Note: The Oxford English Dictionary says that the earliest known use of the noun 'tea-lead' is "in the 1810s"; but the article has not been fully revised for many years.) It is mentioned in an Old Bailey trial of 1751, a Dublin trade advertisement of 1762 (see image), a bee-keeping manual of 1780 and a 1789 book on the care of horses. A 1768 Royal Society chemistry paper inferred that tea lead from China contained tin. In another Old Bailey trial (1817) two men were sentenced to be whipped for stealing 80 pounds of tea lead, valued at 8 shillings.

=== America ===
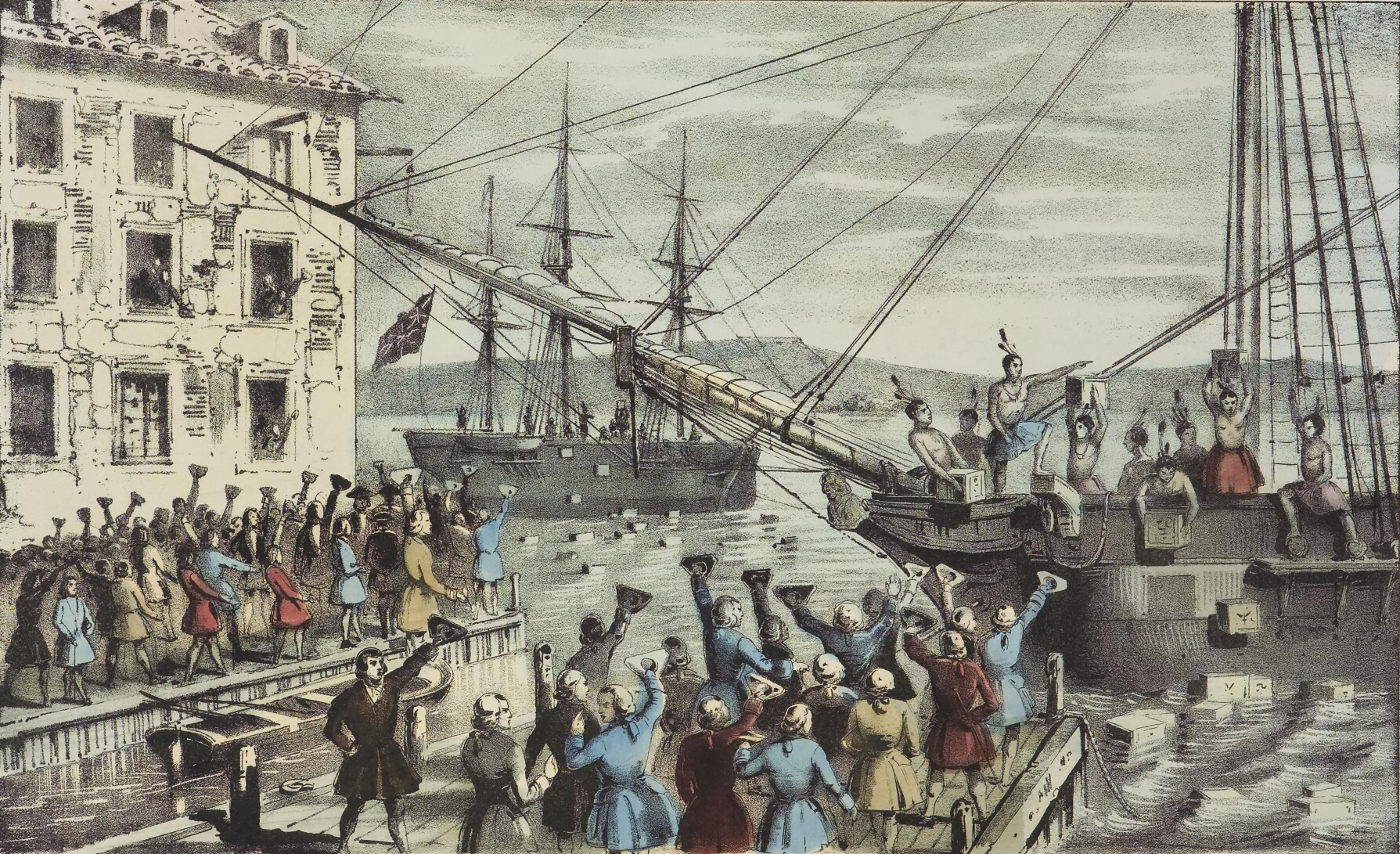
Boston Tea Party. In this 1846 depiction, closed tea chests are casually tossed overboard. The real chests were watertight, and too heavy to lift. (Nathaniel Currier: Springfield Museums Collection.)

The term was also used in colonial America. The rioters of the Boston Tea Party used their hatchets to break open the East India Company's lead-lined chests in order to throw the tea leaves into Boston Harbor. During the Revolution General Wayne wrote General Washington that the British were trying to seduce mutinous American soldiers: he had intercepted a letter to the mutineers "enclosed in a small piece of tea-lead".

Americans were avid drinkers of tea and continued to be so after Boston Harbor and the Revolution; the contrary has been described as a myth. Their merchants established credit links with Chinese producers and imported teas themselves in lead-lined containers. Americans drank more cups of tea than coffee until the late nineteenth century. Recalling his childhood in rural California (1885), a cougar hunter said that the local store sold tea from lead-lined boxes made and packed in China and covered with Chinese writing. Tea lead was still being quoted on the New York Metal Exchange in the 1920s.

== Origins ==
Loading Tea at Canton. Chest sizes varied according to grade of tea.

Tea lead originated in the tea industry of China. Because tea absorbs foreign aromas and spoils if exposed to moisture, tea merchants needed airtight containers to send their product to distant markets. It was particularly so on the long voyage round the Cape of Good Hope since "for dampness transportation on a sailing vessel cannot be equalled". Hence they used wooden tea chests lined with tea lead. The lining was soldered (more precisely, according to one source, welded) to provide a hermetic seal. In Europe, where large quantities of tea were imported, how the Chinese manufactured such thin, uniform sheets of lead was for long a mystery.

=== The Chinese process ===
Skilled Chinese workers cast the foil by hand. They poured molten lead, alloyed with some tin, onto a flat stone, then put another flat stone on top and stood on it. Since the foil was required to be thin — 1/100 inch (0.3 mm) or less — the stones had to be very flat, and the molten lead needed to spread out considerably before cooling to solidification. The craftsmen achieved this by using tiles covered with layers of paper, a poor conductor of heat.

The first published English-language description of the process may be in The Chinese Repository (1839), a periodical founded by American missionaries to China. Later, a more detailed account was published by the English missionary William Lockhart (surgeon). The plumber would equip himself with molten lead, a ladle and a pair of paper-covered tiles, which opened out like the pages of a book (see title image, right).

The man gets on the tiles, and sitting on his heels, takes a ladleful of lead; putting the toes of one foot to the ground, he dexterously lifts with his left hand the front edge of the upper tile, and pours the lead with a sweep between them. Then, raising his foot from the ground, the upper tile yields freely to his weight, and the melted lead is pressed between the papered surfaces, the surplus escaping at the edges. He immediately raises the tile, removes the sheet of lead, and proceeds to make another.

The paper was rice paper, carefully smoothed down. It imparted a rough appearance to the surface of the finished product. The plumber was so adept that the sheets differed little from one another in thickness.

==== Quality control ====
The sheets had to be held up and examined for very fine holes, which were always liable to form, especially in the early stages; the first 20 sheets were automatically rejected. According to Lockhart

His fellow-workmen examine the sheets as they are thrown off. If, as happens at times, they are irregular, they are returned to the melting-pot. If they find them in good order, they rapidly cut them square by the aid of a rule, and solder the small sheets together to serve as large ones. Paper is then pasted down on them, and they are ready to be used as lining for the chests. Sometimes the thin leaden chest is covered with paper after being made up; at other times the separate sheets are covered, and any imperfections attended to afterwards. The paper being inside, the lead chest does not affect the tea, which it would do were the lead and the tea placed in contact.

Apparently the most detailed description of the Chinese process is to be found in an 1839 report by Charles Alexander Bruce of the East India Company. It is available as an external link to this article.

=== Logistics and marketing ===
Treading down tea into chests for export to Europe, Guangzhou c.1800 (Wellcome Collection)

The more expensive teas were shipped in chests that were beautifully decorated. Chinese tea chests may have been "the earliest packages in history to employ elaborate surface graphics".

The chests were standardised by size and weight, which varied according to the type of tea. The largest held 350 lbs (160 kg) of tea, but their gross weight including the lead (which might weigh 10 lbs) and wood was 390 lbs. Their regularity meant that chests could be stowed tightly in ships' holds. The system could be regarded as a forerunner of containerisation. Because ships charged freight based on cubic capacity, not weight, there was an incentive to cram as much tea into a chest as possible, which was done by standing on the tea and treading it down (image). A treader stuffed 200 chests a day.

On arrival at the destination country the chests were opened by Customs and inspected by them and the consignee tea merchants. They were either re-sealed or, if a number of chests had to be "bulked", the contents were spilled out, mixed, and repackaged. Later, samples were taken by boring a small hole; if bulking proved unnecessary, it was plugged wirh a tin bung.

=== Integrity ===
The lead foil preserved the tea over the long sea voyages, and after. The tea would keep in these chests for several years. According to one who had worked in the East India Company's Tea Department, some chests of tea which had been in the Company's warehouse for thirty years "when opened, were found perfectly sweet, and their smell entire", though that was in the early years of the tea trade, when better-keeping qualities were imported.

==== Corrosion: sugar of lead ====
Sometimes the lead foil was found to be corroded with minute holes and the tea damaged. The chemist Alexander Pedler in a series of experiments at the Presidency College, Calcutta determined it was caused by acetic acid formed in unseasoned wood. Metallic lead would react with even small amounts of acetic acid; the reaction made sugar of lead. The remedy was to make tea chests from none but properly seasoned wood. Some years previously a number of tea shippers who had sent tea from China to England on board the S.S. Asia had complained that it was contaminated with a peculiar "sugar" smell. They sued the vessel's owners for bad stowage. At a trial in the Admiralty Division the owners proved the chests has been stowed properly and called the Public Analyst to prove the contamination was likely caused by sugar of lead, formed by acetic acid emanating from unseasoned wood chests.

=== Quantities ===
Very large quantities of tea lead arrived in the destination countries as a by-product of the tea industry. Reliable statistics for the production of tea lead are not available, but a rough impression can be obtained as follows. Chinese exports peaked in 1880 at 279,616,000 pounds of tea. The largest tea chest held 350 pounds of tea and contained about 10 pounds of lead (above). On the simplifying assumption that the tea:lead ratio averaged 350:10, it would translate into an annual 8 million pounds (over 3,500 metric tonnes) of tea lead exported by China alone. (It can be visualised as enough tea lead to cover Hyde Park, London, twice over.) (Note: Since a square foot of tea lead weighed about 1/4 of a pound (Stahel 1880, p. 86), the Chinese output would be enough notionally to cover 700 acres of land. Hyde Park occupies 350 acres.)

By 1900 both India and Ceylon had overtaken China as tea exporters and total world exports amounted to 605,801,000 pounds. At around that time or a little earlier, British production of machine-made tea lead was estimated at an annual 15,000 tons. Even larger quantities still were exported in the 20th century but the proportion packed in tea lead declined.

Eventually rolling mills were able to turn out lead foil only 0.0004 inch thick; it was estimated that "[it] takes 7,000 square inches to make a pound".

=== Necessity ===
Until substitutes were developed for tea lead, tea could not be exported. During the French blockade of Formosa (Taiwan), lead was declared contraband of war; according to the US Consul, Formosan tea merchants became so anxious for the metal that they were buying up leaden candlesticks, and sinkers from fishermen's nets; some were smuggling lead in treasure boxes, disguised as gold or silver bullion.

=== Retailing: packet teas ===
Traditionally, tea was retailed loose. The grocer took some from a chest and weighed it out in the presence of the customer who, at first, was expected to bring his/her own container. Later, the grocer would supply a wrapping, often lead foil; it was weighed with the tea, a trick for giving short weight. To blend complementary grades of tea together was advantageous, and a legitimate art; the grocer did it himself. But some took the opportunity to adulterate with damaged or mouldy tea. The better grocers would blend in the customer's presence: some customers preferred to select and blend in the shop themselves.

==== John Horniman ====
Horniman's advertising stressed that not even the poorest Chinese would drink artificially coloured teas, nor should his customers.

In 1826 John Horniman (Note: 1804-1893) introduced the modern practice of selling unadulterated tea in sealed paper retail packets containing a guaranteed weight e.g. 1/4 lb. The packets were sealed with lead foil and bore a facsimile of his signature. Boycotted by grocers at first, Horniman's Tea packets were sold by peddlers, then pharmacists. The trade was slow to adopt the new practice and it was not until 1900 that more tea was retailed in packets than loose. Even so the commercial impact was large and Horniman died worth over £30,000,000 in present day money. Later, other tea merchants followed Horniman's example. When the Mazawattee Tea Company went public in 1896 its advertising mentioned that the company had its own tea lead rolling-plant.

==== The consumer branding concept ====
Horniman's example has been said to illustrate the difference between a technological invention, which is patentable, and a business invention, which in Europe is not. Horniman's business innovation was to send the foodstuff to the retail consumer in a tamper-proof container bearing his brand, which symbolised his reputation and, over time, became an increasingly valuable business asset. Although producer and consumer did not know each other, the combination made trust possible. This was the rise of modern consumer branding

Where buyer did not know seller, there was information asymmetry, and the traditional legal approach had been caveat emptor, or let the buyer beware. (Note: See the articles Information asymmetry and Caveat emptor for further information and sources.) But when long distance vendors started to put their trade marks on sealed packages, as did Horniman, they had an incentive to maintain quality standards, for it increased the business value of their brand. Later the concept was set out explicitly in the advertising of Chase and Sanborn of Boston, a company which, like Horniman, needed to persuade remote customers to buy an expensive product liable to adulteration; they claimed to be the first firm to sell roast coffee in sealed tins. Thus "names became the agents of trust".

=== Falsification and adulteration ===
Fake "tea" was commonplace. Satirical print by George Cruikshank, British Museum Collection.

When Horniman introduced the tea packet concept, taxes on tea were high, and falsification of teas was rife. Fake tea was manufactured in England by mixing sloe leaves, ash leaves and liquorice; a committee of the House of Commons thought one third of all English "tea", amounting to millions of pounds weight, was made in this way.

Horniman was a Quaker. "Until the time of the Quakers", wrote Ernest Hanbury Hankin, "anyone going into a shop in England had to haggle and bargain about the price or stand the risk of being cheated. The Quakers held it dishonest to ask one price and to accept another. Hence they introduced fixed prices". Horniman started the sealed packet business because the adulteration and artificial colouring of tea was so widespread. At first he packed his packets by hand, then invented a crude machine. His advertising stressed the purity of his teas. Even genuine teas were often "faced" (coloured with chemicals) in China to make them look better quality. In England, spent tea from hotels was dried, "faced" and resold as new.

Public health physician Arthur Hill Hassall said he had analysed samples of regular tea (1874) and found them to be "faced" with black lead or Prussian blue as well as adulterated with sand and other materials. He said all his samples were from Canton, "the great centre of the adulteration of tea", but the British merchants who bought and re-sold it knew perfectly well what was going on. Horniman's advertising (see image) said that in China not even the poorest person would touch "faced" teas: his system ensured that purchasers of his tea did not have to, either.

According to Dr Hassall, tea was adulterated by the addition of foreign vegetable matter, "exhausted" tea leaves and damaged tea; sand, quartz, soap, China clay and magnetic iron oxide — some teas were actually magnetic — as well as coloured or painted with iron ferrocyanide, Prussian blue, indigo and turmeric.

Not all "facing" was fraudulent: some Chinese manufacturers coloured their teas because they thought foreigners preferred it, and several analysts defended the practice. Chinese suppliers also made what they candidly named lie-tea: admittedly fake tea, sold as such, made from other plants and extraneous matter. They sold it to foreign tea merchants who wanted to adulterate real tea.

=== "Tin foil" and tinsel ===
Packet teas were said to be lined with "tinfoil" but an 1862 analysis of a variety of samples found it was mainly lead. The "tin foil" lining a packet of Horniman's tea was found to be 88.665% lead and 11.345% tin. The analyst said it appeared that "'tin foil' is such only in name". What was called tin foil was lead faced with tin, made by rolling a lead ingot between two tin ones. The Australian Brewers' Journal told its readers that what passed for tin foil in bottling was usually lead foil, the former being prohibitively expensive.

Tinsel, used for Christmas decorations, was (according to the American lead industry), lead foil.

== Manufacture of tea lead outside China ==
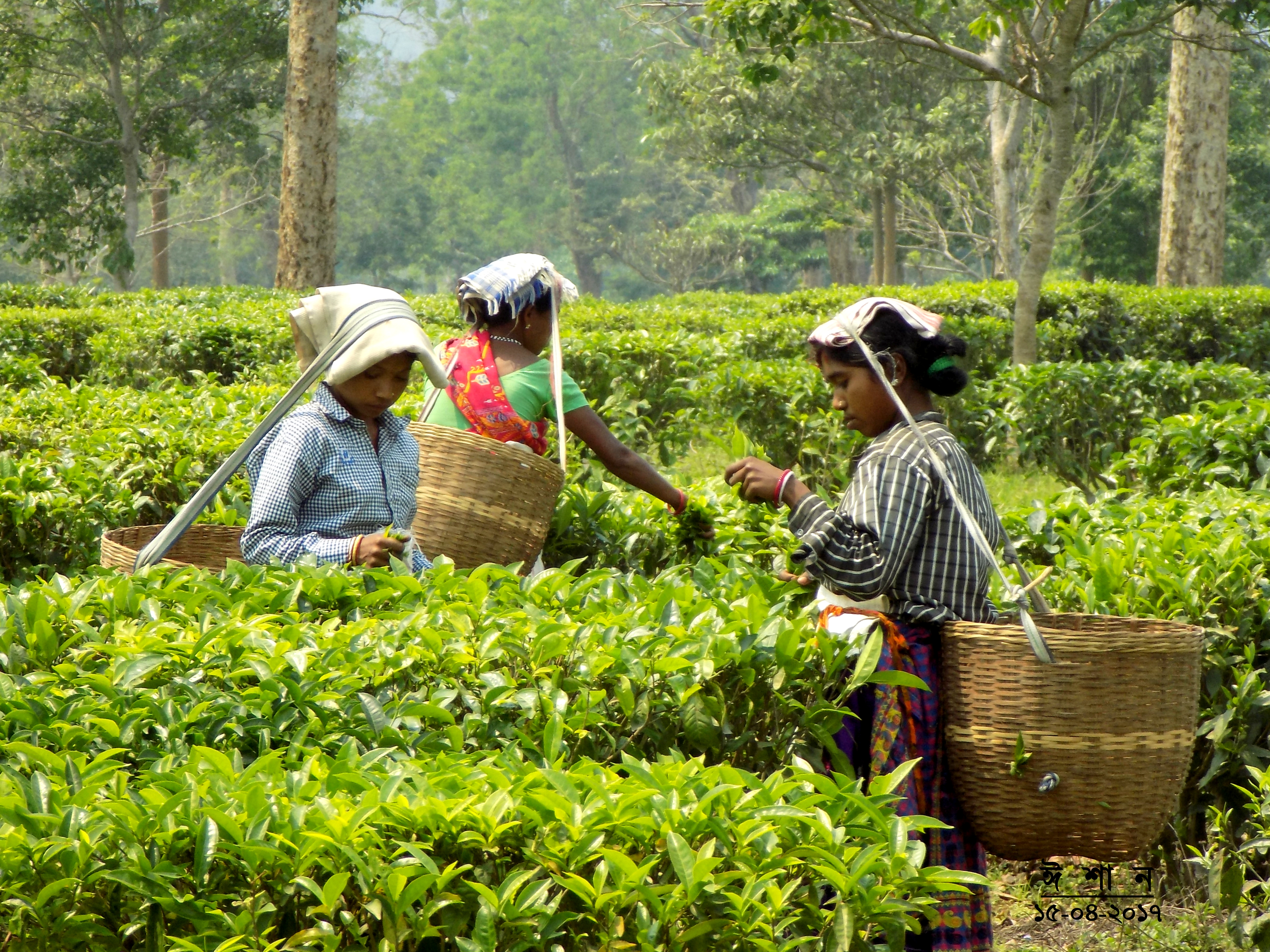
A tea Garden in Assam, NE India

=== Tea industries established in other lands. Demand for tea lead. ===
Traditionally, tea was produced in China and Japan. It was generally believed that it could not be produced anywhere else, since, apparently, neither the Chinese tea plant nor the suite of skills necessary for its exploitation would transfer successfully to other environments.

Under British law the East India Company had the sole right of importing tea from China. Parliament served notice that the Company's monopoly was to be revoked, effective 1833. The Company therefore investigated the possibility of cultivating tea in India. Eventually, after many difficulties, it was found that not only was there a tea plant growing wild in the hills of Assam (a frontier region between India and Burma); but that, under appropriate care, it could be exploited commercially. It required experimentation, and not until 1854 was a respectable quantity of Assam tea — over a quarter of a million pounds — successfully auctioned in London. Over 3 million people migrated to Assam to work on the tea plantations; labour conditions in this frontier region were harsh. In 1878 the Assam seed was introduced to Java, the turning point in the successful development of the Dutch industry, the world's third largest exporter. The Indian industry came to dominate the international markets and the tea cultivation was extended to Ceylon and several other countries. The Chinese cultivar thrived in Darjeeling, however.

From the beginning, and for nearly thirty years afterwards, the supply and making of boxes was a major problem for the Assam tea industry, of which getting supplies of tea lead was a crucial part. The Assam company imported skilled workers from China, including four sheet-lead makers, and copied the Chinese system as best they could. Eventually the new tea-growing lands began to import tea lead machine-made in Britain, as did China itself. (Note: See next section.)

=== Lead mills ===
In the 1860s tea lead began to be manufactured in Britain by machine for export to the Asian tea industries. By 1879, Thomas Messinger Drown writing for The American Cyclopaedia, said that English milled lead had "largely" replaced the tea lead of home manufacture in China. Around the same time an American consul in Japan reported that the Japanese tea industry consumed more than 3 million pounds of tea lead annually, all of it imported from Great Britain; it was preferred because it was very thin and perfectly air-tight.

Some manufacturers of tea lead

From the inventors of Bett's Metal

Thacker's Indian Directory, 1905

Canadian Grocer, 1919

=== Technology ===
The technology required to produce the material is not clearly identified in the sources. An American authority on the secondary metals market wrote that tea lead was made in rolling mills, in which a thick slab of lead was repeatedly passed back and forth between a pair or rollers, which were gradually squeezed together until the appropriate thinness was achieved. The operation required hundreds of passes; so that, the thinner the sheet, the greater the cost. The American consul in Japan (above) thought British tea lead was "not rolled, but shaved"; which may have referred to a process in which a cylinder of lead was turned on a lathe while knife blades shaved sheets of foil from its surface. It is possible that more than one method was used.

Methods of manufacturing tea lead

Rolling mill. By repeated rolling and constricting the roller separation (handle) very thin sheets could be obtained.

Lathe method. A lead cylinder f was turned on a lathe. Inclined knife blades l, l', steadily advancing, shaved off lead sheets, which were drawn off by the rollers.

Betts & Co (see advertisement) made their Incorrodible Tea Lead from "Betts's Metal", for which they had obtained a patent. They rolled out some lead foil; also some much thinner foils of tin; made a tin/lead/tin foil sandwich; and squeezed it under roller pressure to form a laminate.

Tea lead was cut into sheets of standard sizes and supplied in boxes.

=== Rolling mills in India and Ceylon ===
By 1919 rolling mills for making tea lead had been established in Kamarhatty, British India, and in Colombo, Ceylon, and there were proposals for making India self-sufficient in the commodity.

== Extension to other consumer products ==
=== Coffee, tobacco, chewing gum and others ===
The use of lead foil for wrapping tea was extended to other products. By 1830 Fry's and Cadbury's were selling powdered cocoa in lead-foil-wrapped, paper-banded packages. A 1889 booklet issued by Chase & Sanborn advertised, as well as its usual teas in "air-tight tea lead forms", its roasted coffee beans in 1 pound lead foil packs. In 1919 the American Tobacco Co launched its "tea foil" package for its Tuxedo brand smoking tobacco, stressing the material's softness and pliability. By 1931 the American Lead Industries Association could say that thin lead foil was used in the wrapping of cigars, cigarettes, chewing gum, tea, and flowers. "The foil used for wrapping cigarettes is generally .0005 in. thick. Besides being inexpensive, soft lead foil can withstand much bending and abuse without cracking".

Tea lead wrapping spreads to other consumer products

1889. Chase & Sanborn's roast coffee beans in a 1 lb lead-lined packet; the advertisement stresses the 'name as agent of trust' concept (see above).

1919. Chocolate-scented tobacco wrapped in 'tea-foil'

1930. Butter and Cheese Journal

Foil for packaging accounted for a large consumption of lead in the 1920's. Before World War II almost all American cigarettes were wrapped in "tin" foil—in fact, a lead foil with a flash of tin coating over it.

1913. A stockbroker smokes a Fatima while contemplating the ticker tape.

1926. Early Marlboro advertisements were targeted at women.

=== Wartime curtailment ===
The use of lead foil for cigarette packaging was prohibited by the US government during World War II for strategic reasons, and the production of lead foil was severely curtailed as a result. The cigarette industry had used an estimated 85% of the lead foil consumed in the United States; an annual 66,300 tons was diverted to war purposes. Effective March 15, 1942 lead and tin foil were banned not only for cigarettes and tobacco but for beverages of all types, chewing gum and sweets. Lead foil for wrapping never recovered its position. The use of lead foil remained low after the war, while that of aluminium increased sharply.

== Tea lead as scrap ==
A tea chest contained a substantial weight of lead (a large one, perhaps 10 pounds). Very large numbers were imported from Asia to the West. The Mazawattee Tea Company publicised that, in one fiscal year, it had imported 19 1/2 miles of 100-pound tea chests.

=== Collecting ===
At first scrap tea lead was gathered informally by casual workers (e.g. "gypsies collect tea-lead for typefounders") and it could be purchased quite cheaply. Recycling metals was a common practice for craftsmen who worked with lead, which could be melted over a wood fire. The scrap trade was local.

==== Tea lead as a quoted commodity ====
Tea lead prices were published in regional commodity markets (Waste Trade Journal, 8 November 1913)

With the coming of heavy industry there was an unprecedented demand for scrap metals, and small local trades were transformed into larger businesses with transatlantic patterns. Scrap yards often located near railroad tracks, or river and sea ports. As transport improved, the scrap trade became national, then international. It could pay to ship a load of scrap from the American South to Boston. For the editor of that city's Commercial Bulletin (1871),

There was a time when the tin-peddler, roughly sorting his stock, sold it direct to the mill ...; but we have changed that.

By a process of sorting and classification specialist dealers had arisen, each at the top of a pyramid of small mixed traders. To sell metal to consumers it was advantageous to specialise in a single commodity: mills preferred to buy large, homogenous parcels. Intimate knowledge of a market reduced the dealer's risk of holding unsaleable stock. Old metals were traded in recognised classifications, of which tea lead was one.

Scrap dealers began establishing national trade publications and associations before World War I. The Waste Trade Journal was one of the earliest. It quoted the price of tea lead in the secondary metals markets of New York, Philadelphia, Boston, Chicago and Cleveland; the price varied from city to city, but not much. Such markets set the level for the rest of the country. They were, in their turn, influenced by world prices. Even today the remuneration of a waste picker who collects scrap metal in (say) Ankara, Turkey is influenced by trading at the London Metal Exchange, where lead prices are discovered four times a day by open outcry.

"Silver paper" balls, formed from sweet and chocolate wrappings, were mainly lead. Children vied to make large specimens.

==== "Silver paper" ====
Later, children collected what they called "silver paper" and rolled it into balls. It was sold for charity e.g. hospitals and guide dogs. Others called it tinfoil, though generally it was "only sheet lead covered on both sides with tin", more accurately denominated laminated lead. Genuine tinfoil was far more crisp, and expensive. Further details are in this note.

=== Purity ===
The Practical Engineer of Manchester (1892) said tea lead was regarded as the finest [scrap] lead in existence. A handbook of the American scrap metal industry advised that although old lead could be dangerous to melt down — it might detonate — because of occluded impurities, tea lead was safe. The authors reasoned that the Chinese product was good because it was made with new lead, not tainted by recycling:

Tea lead is usually as pure as any grade of commercial lead. It is made from pig lead, since the consumption of lead in China for lining tea chests is so large that it probably exceeds the supply of lead, and, therefore, little scrap can be obtained. The tea lead always is shipped out of the country, and, therefore, is not available for use a second time.

For English metallurgist John Percy the same logic did not apply to machine-made tea lead:

England having introduced thin sheet-lead into China to supersede Chinese tea-lead, old tea-lead came to consist of a mixture of the Chinese and English articles ; and the result was, that pipes produced from such a mixture were softer, darker in colour, and less uniform in quality than the old pipes previously made of genuine Chinese tea-lead.

It became necessary to vary the refining process.

=== Removing paper facing ===
Even so, if the foil was lined with paper, as was most often the case, it had to be removed. This represented a loss in the melting down, ranging from 9 to 18%, or 200 to 300 pounds (90 to 140 kg) in the ton.

== Miscellaneous uses for tea lead ==
=== Pipes ===
Making organ pipes from melted down tea lead (recommended)

Tea lead was available in such large quantities that one 19th century British manufacturer of gas pipes for many years made its entire output from tea lead. Their pipes were said to be very hard and stiff. Tea lead, if sourced from the tea trade, came with paper stuck to one surface, which had to be burned off.

==== Organ pipes ====
In the making of organ pipes, which was a craft operation (Note: There were amateur organ builders. Candidates at the Royal College of Organists had to pass exams in Organ Construction: Hinton 1910, Preface to the Third Edition) that could be done with simple tools in an outhouse:

The best lead is the "tea lead" to be obtained at the grocers' or the tea warehouses. In a large town there is plenty to get... You will observe, if you get any good tea lead, some of it is being very near spotted metal. (Note: For organ builders, a particularly fine grade of lead.) Pipes made from tea lead have always a whiter appearance when finished, and keep their colour better, than those made from ordinary pig or sheet-lead.

The lead was alloyed with some tin. Hinton, Organ Construction (3rd ed) agreed that "Tea lead is perhaps the best for pipe work in general".

=== Solder ===
Standard solder for lead comprised two parts of lead and one of tin. In The Panorama of Science and Art (1825) James Smith said: "The metal with which tea-chests are lined, familiarly called tea-lead, is an alloy principally composed of lead and tin. It is generally sold at so low a rate, that it is bought by manufacturers who require alloys of lead, as a cheap method of obtaining that metal already somewhat enriched". Some parcels contained so much tin that "they make excellent solder for lead without any further admixture. No solder can be obtained at so low a price as this".

Scientific American (1887) gave directions for making tinner's solder from tea lead. Adding bismuth lowered its melting point at will. Thus joke teaspoons could be made that melted in a hot cup of tea.

=== Dentistry ===
Filling a molar cavity with foil (Ambler, 1897). Some dentists preferred it to gold or amalgam.

Filling teeth was an art little practised by ordinary dentists until the 19th century, when dental fillings began to be made of lead. (In French, plombage is still used to refer to dental fillings, for that reason.) Tea lead was preferred by 'connoisseurs'. "A piece being torn off, was rolled between the fingers into a ball or pellet sufficiently large to more than fill the cavity after packing, and was then forced to its place by one or two straight instruments, dressed off and polished with a burnisher. This metal, soft and ductile, and easily compressible, long formed the principal filling material". Dental anaesthesia not being established until after 1846, an American dentist (1843) commended tea lead because it was soft, did not press too severely on the nerve, and lasted for years. Another method was packing a cavity with rolled up foil (image), which some dentists preferred over gold or amalgam fillings. Tea lead was also used in the making of dental plates.

=== Plugging leaks ===
The softness, ductility and ubiquity of tea lead made it useful for analogous purposes where solutions to problems had to be improvised.

In 1913 the remains of USS Niagara (built 1813) were raised from the bed of Lake Erie. The salvors discovered that her seams had been caulked with tea lead — presumably because oakum, the usual material, was in short supply. Engineers in Springfield, Massachusetts found that leaking water pipes could be plugged by tamping with tea lead, there being no need to turn off the water. In early railway locomotives the glands and stuffing boxes had to be packed daily with hemp or other fibrous materials, which was tedious. A few engineers tried packing with tea lead: it lasted so well that, according to railway historian Marshall Kirkman, it may have been the origin of the metallic packing afterwards generally used on valve stems and piston rods. The same was done to temporarily repair power plants in rural America: "Even in isolated country grocery stores it is usually possible to get tea lead and old tin foil from the owner", wrote one engineer.

=== Printer's type ===
Tea lead was melted down to make printer's type. It was recommended to be alloyed with some antimony and tin.

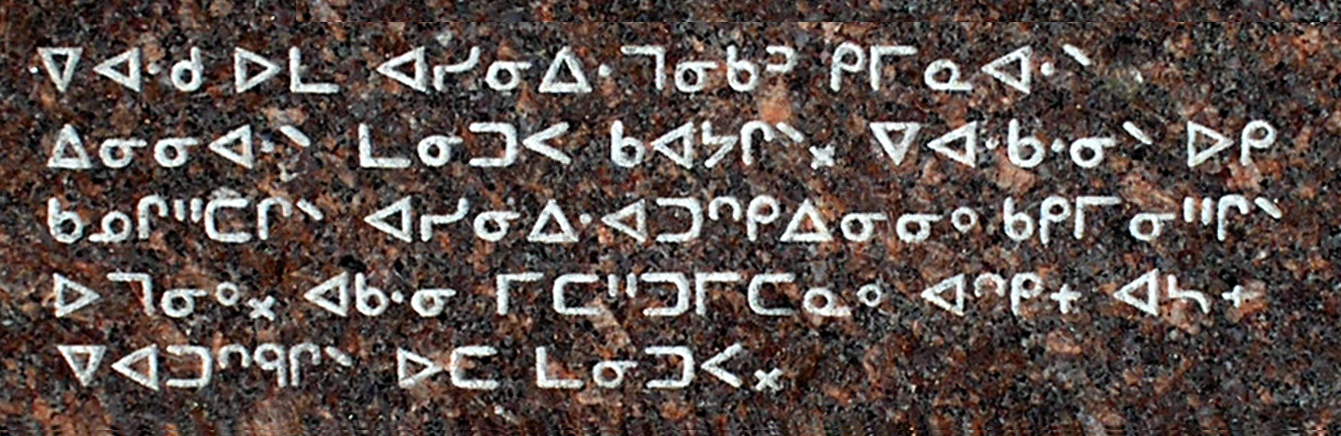
Cree Inscription

After the missionary James Evans created his writing system for the Cree language (1830s) he wished to distribute portions of scripture to his flock in up-country Manitoba. He made a crude printing press using lead from tea chests, which "he begged from fur traders, who sell large quantities of tea to the Indians", and printed his texts on birch bark.

=== Ammunition ===
"Villanous" Filipino bullets (New York Daily Tribune)

Americans in the War of 1812 made cartridges for cannon (Note: A cartridge was a bag of gunpowder, rammed into the gun before the shot. Normally the bag was made of fabric (Hebert, 1849).) out of tea lead; "the advantage of which is, that the guns do not require sponging, and that no ignited portions of the cartridge can remain in the chamber, from which most dreadful accidents sometimes happen".

Pioneers in the North American backcountry used tea boxes as a source of lead for casting bullets. One backwoodsman recalled: "The lining of each tea-box supplied enough lead to form a hundred bullets, at least. Crumpling up the sheet lead we melted it in a heavy skillet and poured it into our molds".

During the Philippine-American war the Filipino insurgents, denied bullets by the American embargo, improvised them from tea lead, of which large quantities were available. The lead sheets were not melted down. They were rolled and pounded as in Fig. 2, and on discharge opened out as in Fig. 3, reportedly making jagged, dangerous wounds.

=== Curling hair ===
Mr Pickwick accidentally enters the wrong bedroom ('Phiz', 1874). Hair curling was a painful nightly ritual.

Tea lead was in demand for "doing up" hair. "No little girl, when I was a child [in pre-1918 California], wore her hair straight — If it was not naturally curly it was done up on rags or tea lead", wrote Ruth Orzalli. Hair, thus tied, curled overnight. Recalling her Nantucket childhood, Mary Starbuck said "Each night those whose hair didn't naturally curl had to have the hair done up in little cotton strips or in tea-leads. We haunted the grocery stores for 'tea-lead', for, though it hurt more than cloth, it [the 'doing-up'] took less time".

In his mock-heroic poem The Rape of the Lock (Note: The "Lock" refers to her hair, and "Rape" to an incident when a lock was plucked out.) (1714) Alexander Pope satirised the painful rituals women had to endure for the sake of hair fashions:

For this your Locks in Paper-Durance (Note: Prison.) bound,
For this with tort'ring (Note: torturing) Irons wreath'd around?
For this with Fillet (Note: A type of headband.) strain'd your tender Head,
And bravely bore the double Loads of Lead?

Tea lead in hair could be used decoratively. In the 19th century "dancing for eels" competitions at Catherine Market, New York, African-Americans from Tappan, New Jersey "were known by their suppleness and plaited forelocks tied up with tea-lead".

=== Fishing ===
Fishermen used tea lead to improvise sinkers. According to The American Angler (1893), "the average fisher continues to use a cheap cane pole and a heavy, coarse line, a large cork for a float and a wad of tea lead for a sinker". Lead foil is still used today in fly fishing.

=== Boxing ===
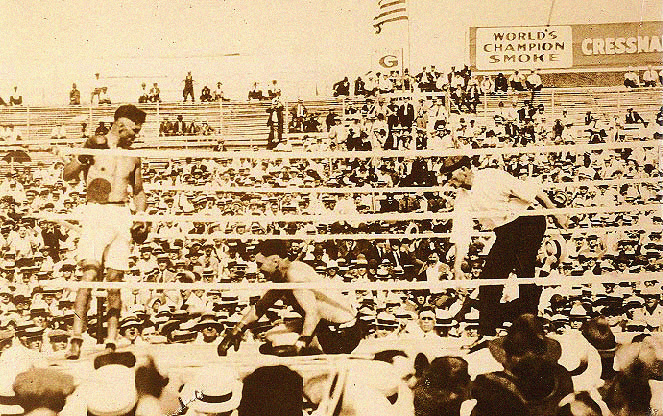
Willard vs. Dempsey title fight

A well known trick in professional boxing was for a pugilist to put tea lead inside his hand-bandages, a foul that could blind an opponent

Jack Dempsey was alleged to have used it in his 1919 world championship fight against Jess Willard. Dempsey's manager denied it, saying it would have been "sheer idiocy", since what Dempsey needed was speed.

=== Retail fraud ===
Tea lead was unobtrusive, dense and ubiquitous, which lent it to the purpose of tampering with weighing machines. The Sealer of Weights and Measures for Boston, who reported that giving short weight was commonplace in the city, said

Many grocers and tea-dealers resort to the practice of winding tea-lead around the arms of their counter scales, in order to give down weight, and cheat their customers from one to three ounces every time a scale is used.

One who was caught altering a weight said "that others did it, and he must do it to be able to compete with his neighbors". In New York the Bureau of Weights and Measures displayed, amongst other false devices seized by their inspectors, scale pans with tea lead stuck to their bottoms. With this trick some grocers defrauded the customer of perhaps an ounce or more every time the scale was used. "In neighborhoods where poor people live, people who buy tea, coffee, butter, etc., by the half pound or pound, such frauds make a terrible percentage against the customer", reported the Bureau chief. The trick was known in London also.

=== Bandages ===
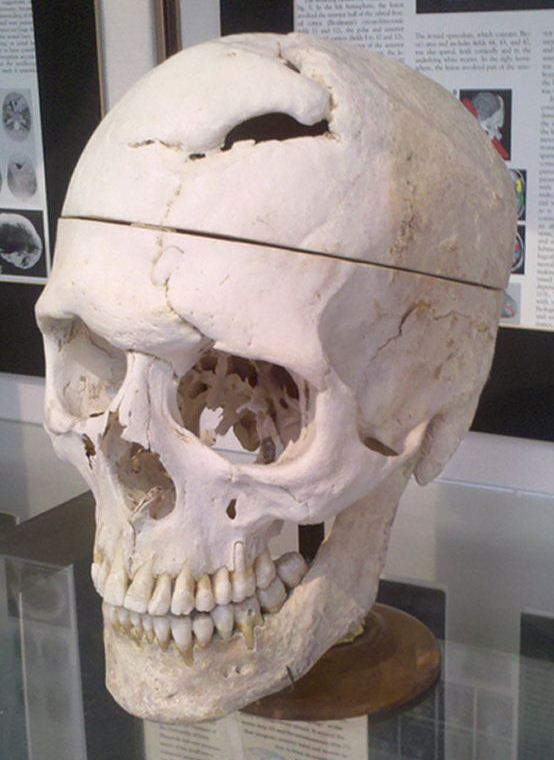
Skull of Phineas Gage, who survived the accident. His brain was held in place by a compress of tea lead.

A sheet of tea lead was reasonably stiff, more so when folded into multiple layers, and could be employed as a compression bandage or a skin prosthesis. From the following sources (Note: See next section.) its use appears to have been unremarkable in 19th century medicine. They do not discuss the risk of lead poisoning, however.

==== In medicine and surgery ====
An English doctor in China reported that he obtained good results for chronic ulcers by covering them with a layer of tea lead. He could not say if it was the even pressure, or the chemical action, that was beneficial; but it was effective. Two Paris hospitals had already claimed it was. A Pennsylvania physician recommended an artificial scrotum made from tea lead. It was used in the operation of tapping (Note: Not taping. Tapping referred to draining the cavity before strapping.) and strapping in cases of hydrocele testis.

Phineas Gage, aged 25, was accidentally penetrated through the brain by a large iron bolt but, surprisingly, lived. According to John P. Gray (psychiatrist), Gage was observed shortly after the accident by Dr. John Ordronaux, who said that the exposed brain could be seen, "pulsating", near the original place of the anterior fontanelle. "Though he had lost so much brain substance, and a compress of tea-lead was kept upon the wound to prevent the extrusion of the brain, he had lost nothing of mental power and sagacity". He made a fair recovery. Later he obtained employment as a stagecoach driver.

==== For babies' navels ====
A Victorian manual on the care of babies said it was important for mothers to watch out for inflamed navels. For a "starting" or bleeding navel she was to

get, if you can, some tea-lead — any grocer would give you a piece or, if you have one, from your own chest of tea. Press it smoothly out and fold four thicknesses of it an inch and a half square, cover with a piece of soft linen, and then bind firmly.

==== As nipple shields ====
Radiograph demonstrating opacity of tea-lead lettering

The Society for the Encouragement of Arts, Manufactures and Commerce published a vote of thanks to a Chelsea doctor who had introduced a shield for sore nipples. It was made of tea lead and was to be applied immediately after childbirth. "Its curative character consists of the nipple being immersed in a lotion produced by a lactate of lead, formed by the lactic acid acting on the metal". He had been giving them to his patients for 25 years.

Lead nipple shields did ease the pain of cracked nipples and were at one time popular in Britain, America and France. Later, there were reports of groups of cases where nursing infants suffered lead poisoning caused by prolonged maternal use of lead nipple-shields.

=== As X-ray shields ===
In the early days of X-ray treatment, patients were shielded from unnecessary radiation by applying a layer of tea lead, e.g. "It is good practice to cover the eyes with spectacles covered with tea lead and protect the hair with a sheet of tea lead". The 'mirror' writing in the radiograph (1896 image) was made by interposing lettering cut from a sheet of tea lead, intended to show the material's opacity to X-rays.

== Health concerns ==
Lead-mill worker: blue gum-line betrays plumbism (Barts Health NHS Trust Archives)

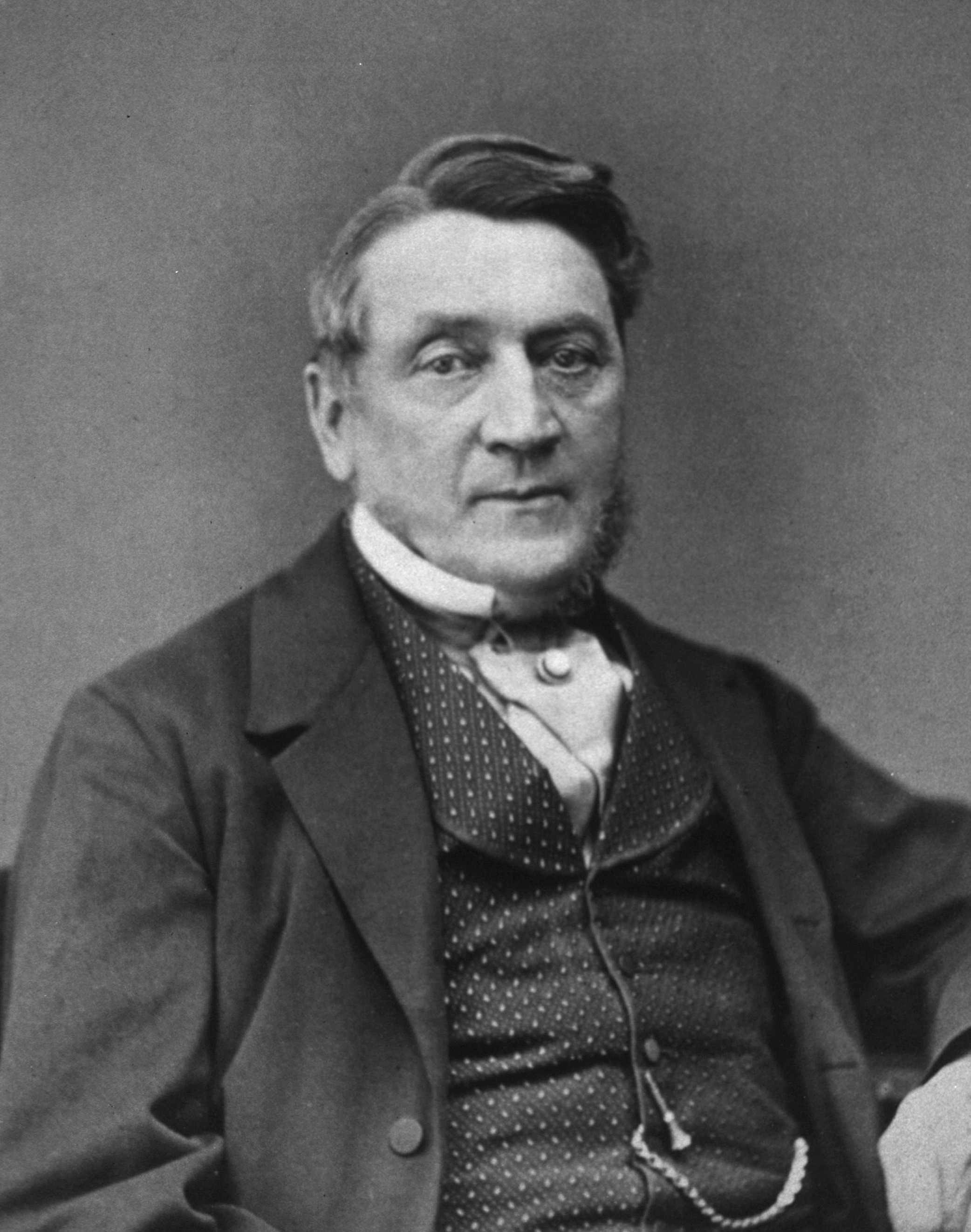
Alfred Swaine Taylor who warned of the dangers of lead foil wrapping and so-called "tinfoil"

Lead’s toxicity was recognized and recorded as early as 2000 BC. In the Victorian era it was well known that to work in the lead industry and handle lead brought sickness (regarded as inevitable) or death; the symptoms were vividly described by Charles Dickens.

The medical profession agreed that insidious lead poisoning — by the gradual accumulation of minute quantities of lead in the human body — was in a way worse than acute poisoning, because it all too easily escaped diagnosis. Some physicians, even specialists, had failed to diagnose it in their own bodies. Chronic lead poisoning was most obvious as an occupational disease e.g. in plumbers or painters, but the metal was also known to be ingested in food, water and liquor. "In the cumulative action of the poison lies its danger", Sir Thomas Oliver told the Royal College of Physicians.

The toxicologist Alfred Swaine Taylor (1875) held that snuff and tobacco were liable to be impregnated with lead if kept in lead wrappers, or in "a spurious alloy of lead , called 'patent tin-foil'". He was specifically alluding to the material known as Betts' Patent Metal, used to make their tea lead (see their advertisement, above). Made of lead foil faced with tin, the tin might corrode. Chocolate and baby food too were wrapped in this material, which Taylor believed to be dangerous.

Generally, however, there was little concern about the contamination of food by tea lead, because the material was lined on the food side with a layer of paper, which was thought to be a barrier. Lockhart, himself a surgeon, in describing the Chinese method of lining tea chests (above), said

The paper being inside, the lead chest does not affect the tea, which it would do were the lead and the tea placed in contact.

In 1935 the US Food and Drug Administration undertook a comprehensive survey of metal foil wrappers to see if they contaminated food with lead. They concluded that, provided the foil was protected by a layer of paper, it was safe to use for wrapping dry products. Without the paper, tea could indeed be contaminated with lead. Even with a paper layer, lead could contaminate moist or salty foods like cheese and butter. The FDA recommended that the lead content of foil wrappers be reduced as much as practicable.

Much later it was discovered by Clair Patterson that environmental lead contamination was global and ubiquitous: what passed for "normal" lead levels were not natural — merely typical. Very small quantities in the environment could harm the development of children. Since 1970 much stricter standards have been imposed and in the United States, for example, mean blood lead levels have declined dramatically.

By 1956, C.R. Harler in The Culture and Marketing of Tea wrote: "The linings of tea chests have changed in the past few years. At one time lead foil was the rule, but Food Regulations following on agitation from certain consumer countries about 1930 put these out of court... The common chest lining now is aluminium foil with white parchment paper".

== In literature ==
In Joseph C. Lincoln's Mr. Pratt: a Novel (1906), two rich New Yorkers foreswear money-making and go to Cape Cod to live "the Natural Life". But each reverts to type, secretly speculating in "Consolidated Tea Lead". They discover each other thus:

Tea Lead? " breaks in Hartley. " Have you been buying Tea Lead? " Yes, I have. I'm carrying a pretty good load of it, too, worse luck.

== Sources ==
- "A New Process for Making Sheet Lead". The American Architect and Building News. Vol. XVIII, no. 511. 10 October 1885. p. 170.
- Allaben, Frank, ed. (1913). Perry's Victory Centennial Souvenir: the "Niagara" Keepsake. New York: The Journal of American History.
- Ambler, Henry L. (1897). Tin Foil and Its Combinations for Filling Teeth. Philadelphia: The S.S. White Dental Manufacturing Co.
- American Artisan (11 June 1887). "Making Solder". Scientific American. LVI (24): 373.
- American Tobacco Co (July 1919). "Have You Tried Tuxedo in the New "TEA FOIL" PACKAGE?". McClure's Magazine. p. 56.
- Andersohn, A. (1875). "Lead and Tin Foil". Scientific American. 33 (6): 82. JSTOR 10.2307/26052526.
- Anderson, George E. (23 October 1915). "Crisis In China Lead Market". Commerce Reports. 249. Washington DC: US Department of Commerce: 352.
- Antrobus, H. A. (1957). A History of the Assam Company (1839- 1953). Edinburgh: Constable.
- Arora, Amit (2005). Text Book of Inorganic Chemistry. New Delhi: Discovery Publishing House. ISBN 81-8356-013-X.
- Baker, Charles (1857). The Teacher's Handbook to the Circle of Knowledge. London: Wertheim & MacIntosh.
- Baldock, J.H. (1862). "On the Adulteration of Tin Foil". Chemical News. V: 59–60.
- Ball, Phinehas (1875). "Mr. Ball's Report". Report of the Board of Water Commissioners of the City of Springfield. Springfield, Mass: Clark W. Bryan.
- Beebe, Lucius (1936). Boston and the Boston Legend. New York and London: D. Appleton/Century Company.
- Betts v. Menzies, 7 L.T.n.s. 110 (House of Lords 1863).
- Bissell, Philip A. (4 December 1875). "Tapping—Strapping". Medical and Surgical Reporter. Vol. xxxiii, no. 23. pp. 458–9.
- Brous, Florence A. (1943). Bibliography and Survey on Lead Poisoning, with Particular Reference to Packaging. New York: Technical Committee of the Packaging Institute.
- Bruce, Jay C. (1953). Cougar Killer. New York: Comet Press Books., p.80
- "Bullets of Filipinos". New York Daily Tribune. 2 September 1900. p. 10.
- Cavanagh, William J. (1928). Instructions in Boxing: Both Individual and for Beginners and Those Who Are Advanced in the Manly Art of Self-defence. West Point, N.Y.: Cornwall Press.
- Chase & Sanborn (1889). Tea and Coffee Importers (4th ed.). Boston, Mass.: Chase & Sanborn.
- "Collecting Silver Paper". Shields Daily News. 15 November 1929. p. 4.
- Cooley, A. James; North, W. (1892). Cooley's Cyclopædia of Practical Receipts and Collateral Information in the Arts, Manufactures, Professions, and Trades (7 ed.). London: J. & A. Churchill.
- "Description of the tea plant; its name; cultivation; mode of curing the leaves; transportation to Canton; sale and foreign consumption; endeavors to raise the shrub in other countries". The Chinese Repository. Canton. July 1839.
- Dallas, Sherman F. (1954). "Marketing Scrap Metal". Journal of Marketing. 19 (2): 164–166. JSTOR 1247732.
- Davidson, John Wheeler (1903). The Island of Formosa, Past and Present. History, People, Resources, and Commercial Prospects. Tea, Camphor, Sugar, Gold, Coal, Sulphur, Economical Plants, and Other Productions. London and New York: Macmillan.
- De Voe, Thomas F. (1862). The Market Book. Containing a Historical Account of the Public Markets of New York Boston Philadelphia and Brooklyn. Vol. I. New York: printed for the author.
- DeForest, Jimmy (5 November 1923). "Dempsey Tactics Big Surprise to Jess at Toledo". Washington Times Sports. p. 17.
- Derry, Patrick (11 January 1906). "Executive Department: Bureau of Weights and Measures: Report for the Year Ending December 31, 1905". The City Record: Official Journal. Vol. XXXIV, no. 9037. City of New York.
- Dexter, James E., ed. (1876). A History of Dental and Oral Science in America. Prepared under direction of American Academy of Dental Science. Philadelphia: Samuel S. White.
- Dey, Arnab (2015). "Bugs in the Garden: Tea Plantations and Environmental Constraints in Eastern India (Assam) 1840–1910". Environment and History. 21 (4): 537–565. JSTOR 24810625.
- Dignam, Timothy; Kaufmann, Rachel B.; LeStourgeon, Lauren; Brown, Mary Jean (2019). "Control of Lead Sources in the United States, 1970-2017: Public Health Progress and Current Challenges to Eliminating Lead Exposure". Journal of Public Health Management & Practice. 25 (Suppl 1). doi:10.1097/PHH.0000000000000889. JSTOR 10.2307/48518060. PMC 6522252. PMID 30507765.
- Dinler, Demet Şahende (2016). A multi-sited analysis of rules and regulations in the recycling market from Ankara to London (PhD thesis). SOAS, University of London.
- "Directions Regarding the Use of Tin. By Manufacturers of Candies, Spices And Certain Other Articles of Food". The Official U.S. Bulletin. 29 October 1918. p. 11.
- Drown, Thomas M. (1879). "Lead". In George Ripley; Charles Dana (eds.). The American Cyclopaedia: A Popular Dictionary of General Knowledge. Vol. 10 (2 ed.). New York: Appleton.
- Du, Dan (2017). This world in a teacup: Chinese-American tea trade in the nineteenth century (PhD thesis). University of Georgia.
- Friend to the Public (1785). The Tea Purchaser's Guide; or, the Lady and Gentleman's Tea Table and Useful Companion in the Knowledge and Choice of Teas. London: G. Kearsley.
- Galloway, W.A. (1942). "Wartime Adjustments in the Tobacco Industry". Domestic Commerce: A Weekly Bulletin of the National Economy. Vol. 19, no. 14. U.S. Department of Commerce.
- Gibb, Thomas Ecclestone (1870). "Evidence of, 21 July 1869". Third Report of the Commissioners Appointed to Inquire Into the Condition of the Exchequer (now Board of Trade) Standards. On the Abolition of Troy Weight. London: HMSO.
- Gray, John P. (1872). "Article IX. Thoughts on the Causation of Insanity". Transactions of the Medical Society of the State of New York. Albany: 232–245.
- Gray, Milner (1939). "The History and Development of Packaging". Journal of the Royal Society of Arts. 87 (4511): 633–658. JSTOR 41359334.
- Greenwood, I. I. (1843). "On Plugging the Teeth". The American Journal of Dental Science. III (4): 237–240. PMID 30749349.
- Guild, Curtis (1871). "The Junk Trade". Seventeenth Annual Report of the Boston Board of Trade. Boston: Barker, Cotter.
- Hankin, E. H. (1922). "The Mental Ability of the Quakers". Science Progress in the Twentieth Century (1919-1933). 16 (64): 654-664`. JSTOR 43431481.
- Harler, C.R. (1956). The Culture and Marketing of Tea (2 ed.). London, New York, Bombay: Oxford University Press.
- Harpf, A. (30 June 1893). "The Precipitation of Tin by Zinc". The Journal of the Society of Chemical Industry. XII (6): 522.
- Hassall, Arthur Hill (9 January 1874). "The Adulteration of Tea". The Times. London. p. 6.
- Hassall, Arthur Hill (1876). Food: Its Adulterations, and the Methods for Its Detection. London: Longmans, Green and Co.
- Hebert, Luke (1849). The Engineer's & Mechanic's Encyclopædia. Vol. I (2 ed.). London: Thomas Kelly.
- Herrick, Arthur D. (1947). Food Regulation and Compliance. Vol. 2. New York: Revere.
- Hinton, J.W. (1910). Organ Construction (3 ed.). London: Weekes.
- Hirsch, William Crawford (April 1919). "Lead — Its Modern Sphere of Usefulness". Raw Material. Vol. 1, no. 2., p.156
- Holbrook, W. D. (1892). "Holbrook's Patent Dental Plate". Dental Cosmos. XXXIV (1). Philadelphia: 769–70.
- Howat, R.G.; Blacksell, Joan S. (22 October 1949). "Correspondence" (PDF). British Medical Journal: 931.
- Hubbell, Eugene (1907). "X-Ray in the Treatment of Cancer and Skin Diseases". American Journal of Dermatology. 11 (10): 452–4.
- Huxley, Gervas (1956). Talking About Tea. Ivyland, PA: John Wagner & Sons., pp.45-7
- 'J. C.' (1879). Babies, and How to Take Care of Them. London: Ward, Lock.
- Jones, Jabez (1879). "No. 26: Manufacture of Sheet Metal". Specifications of Letters Patent for Inventions and Provisional Specifications Filed and Recorded at the Office of the Commissioners for Patents for Inventions. Vol. I. London: Commissioners for Patents Sales Department.
- Keys, John (1780). The Practical Bee-Master. London: printed for the author. p. 277.
- King, Edmund E. (1896). "Roentgen Skiagraphy". The Canadian Practitioner. 21 (4): 241–7.
- Kirkland, C.M. (1857). Memoirs of Washington. New York: D. Appleton.
- Kirkman, Marshall Monroe (1916). Kirkman's Science of Railways. Vol. 8. Chicago: Cropley Phillips.
- Koehler, Jeff (2016). Darjeeling: a History of the World's Greatest Tea (Kindle ed.). Bloomsbury. ISBN 978-1-4088-4592-9.
- Krom, L.J. (August 1918). "The Manufacture of Tin and Lead Foil: A Brief Description of the Production of These Important Products". The Metal Industry. 16 (8).
- Lambert, Thomas (1901). Lead and Its Compounds. London: Scott Greenwood.
- Lead Industries Association (1931). Useful Information About Lead. New York: Lead Industries Association.
- Lead Industries Association (1952). Lead in Modern Industry. New York: Lead Industries Association.
- Lewis & Co, a member of the firm of (1894). Tea and Tea Blending (4th ed.). London: Eden Fisher.
- Lincoln, Joseph C (1906). Mr. Pratt: a Novel. New York: A.L. Burt.
- Liverpool Lead Works (22 September 1863). "The Liverpool Lead Works Company (Limited)". Liverpool Daily Post. p. 6, col. 6.
- Lockhart, William (1861). The Medical Missionary in China: a Narrative of Twenty Years' Experience. London: Hurst & Blackett.
- Manlove, George H.; Vickers, Charles (1925). Scrap Metals, Study of Iron and Steel Old Material, its Preparation and Markets. The Old Metals. Cleveland, O.: Penton Publishing Co.
- Mann, Harold H. (1931). "The Indian Tea Industry In Its Scientific Aspects". Journal of the Royal Society of Arts. 79 (4089): 469–483. JSTOR 41358750.
- Mazawattee Tea Company (23 May 1896). "The Mazawattee Tea Company Limited". The Saturday Review of Politics, Literature, Science and Art. Vol. LXXXI.
- Mazawattee, Tea Company (17 March 1900). "Mazawattee Tea Record Duty Cheque". The Sphere. London. p. ii.
- McCallum, Rebecca (2021). The Business of Tea: British tea companies and plantation labor law in India, 1901–1951 (with special emphasis on James Finlay & Co.) (PhD} thesis). Montreal: McGill University.
- "Metals". The Waste Trade Journal. Vol. 6, no. 1. New York: The Waste Trade Publishing Company. 8 November 1913. p. 10.
- Miller, Heinie (April 1914). "Fair and Unfair Tricks of the Prize Ring". Our Navy: The Standard Magazine of the U.S. Navy. Vol. VII, no. 12. New York and San Francisco: Our Navy Publishing Co Inc. p. 45.
- Needleman, Herbert L (1999). History of lead poisoning in the world (PDF). International conference on lead poisoning prevention and treatment. Bangalore.
- Nelson, D. M. (25 November 1941). "Limitation Order L-25: Tin Foil and Lead Foil". Federal Register. 6 (228): 5954.
- "New Method of Making Sheet Lead". The Popular Science News and Boston Journal of Chemistry. Vol. XX, no. 2. February 1886. p. 19.
- New York Metal Exchange (31 December 1925). "Old Metals". Official Daily Report. Vol. XXXIV, no. 246. p. ii.
- Noble, James E. (May 1925). "Expedients in Power Plant Engineering". Refrigerating World. New York: Ice Trade Journal Co.
- Oliver, Thomas (1891). Lead Poisoning in its Acute and Chronic Forms: The Goulstonian Lectures, Delivered in the Royal College of Physicians, March 1891. London and Edinburgh: Young J. Pentland.
- Orzalli, Ruth Vivian (2014). I Remember: California's Yesterdays. XLibris. ISBN 978-1-4990-5100-1.
- Pedler, Alex. (1895). "Memorandum on the Corrosion of the Lead Linings of Indian Tea Chest". Journal of the Asiatic Society of Bengal. 54 (2): 159–175.
- Percy, John (1870). The Metallurgy of Lead including Desilverization and Cupellation. London: John Murray.
- Peters, Fred P. (1944). "Lead Carries Its Weight". Scientific American. 170 (6): 250–252. JSTOR 10.2307/24997787.
- Rappaport, Erika (2017). A Thirst for Empire: How Tea Shaped the Modern World. Princeton and Oxford: Princeton University Press. ISBN 9780691192703.
- Reece, Richard, ed. (1830). "Ulcers". The Monthly Gazette of Health. XIV: 412.
- Revill, Alfred (1894). American Plumbing: a Complete Compendium of Practical Plumbing, From Solder Making to High-Class Open Works. New York: Excelsior Publishing House.
- Ripley, George; Dana, Charles A., eds. (1879). "Lead". The American Cyclopaedia. Vol. 10 (2 revised ed.). New York: Appleton.
- Roberts, Jenifer L. (2014). Transporting Visions: The Movement of Images in Early America. Berkeley: University of California Press. ISBN 978-0-520-25184-7.
- Robertson, W. T. (1892). "The Cultivation and Manufacture of Tea". The Agricultural Gazette of New South Wales. 2: 580–6.
- Rowe, D. J. (2018). Lead Manufacturing in Britain: A History (Kindle ed.). Oxford and New York: Routledge Library Editions: Environmental and Natural Resource Economics). ISBN 978-1-315-11276-3.
- "Salvation from Waste: Newsagents Want 'Silver Paper'". Westminster & Pimlico News. 3 December 1926. p. 7.
- "Save Your Tin or Lead-Foil". Berwick Advertiser. 12 May 1927. p. 3.
- "'Silver Paper'". Northern Whig. 7 June 1937. p. 11.
- Singer, Charles; Holmyard, E.J; Hall, A.R.; Williams, Trevor I., eds. (1958). A History of Technology. Vol. IV. London: Oxford University Press.
- Smith, James (1825). "Mechanical Exercises". The Panorama of Science and Art. Vol. I (11 ed.). London: Caxton Press.
- Smith, James A. (17 December 1919). "Industrial Development in Bengal". Commerce Reports. 295. Washington DC: US Department of Commerce.
- Smyth, John Armstrong (1920). Lead including Lead Pigments and the Desilverisation of Lead. London: Sir Isaac Pitman and Sons., p.84
- Somerville, J. R. (1875). "Report on the Health of Foochow (Pagoda Anchorage) for the Half Year Ended 30th September 1875". Customs Gazette: Medical Reports for the Half Year Ended 30th September, 1875; Forwarded by the Surgeons to the Customs at the Treaty Ports in China. Vol. XXVII. Shanghai: Inspector General of Customs. pp. 27–46.
- Southward, John (1899). Modern Printing. A Handbook of the Principles and Practice of Typography and the Auxiliary Arts. Vol. II (2nd ed.). London: Raithby, Lawrence & Co.
- Sperry, Erwin S., ed. (October 1907). "Tea Lead". The Brass World and Platers Guide. A Journal Devoted to the Art of Refining, Alloying, Casting, Rolling, Founding, and Electroplating of All Non-Ferrous Materials. III (10). Bridgeport, Conn.: 339–41.
- Stahel, J. (1880). "The Consumption of Tea-Lead in Japan". Commercial Relations of the United States: Reports from the Consuls of the United States on the Commerce, Manufactures, Etc. of their Consular Districts. Washington: State Department.
- Stanford University (2026a). "Fatima - img6392". SRITA (Research Into the Impact of Tobacco Advertising).
- Stanford University (2026b). "Marlboro - img1069". SRITA (Research Into the Impact of Tobacco Advertising).
- Starbuck, Mary Eliza (1929). My House and I: a Chronicle of Nantucket. Boston and New York: Houghton Mifflin.
- Strong, Henry R.; James, F. L., eds. (April 1900). "Lead Foil". National Druggist. Vol. XXX. St. Louis: Henry R. Strong.
- Taplin, William (1789). The Gentleman's Stable Directory, or Modern System of Farriery (9th ed.). London: G. Kearsley., p.393
- Taylor, Alfred Swaine (1875). On Poisons in relation to Medical Jurisprudence and Medicine (3rd American ed.). Philadelphia: Henry C. Lea. pp. 416–7.
- "Tea-Chest Lead". The Practical Engineer. Manchester. 13 May 1892. p. 371.
- Tea Planter's Gazette (1885). The Tea Planter's Vade Mecum. Calcutta: Office of the Tea Gazette., p.249
- "'Tin Foil'". British Medical Journal. 8 December 1888. p. 1300.
- Theiss, Lewis Edwin (January 1910). "How Tradesmen Cheat the Household". Pearson's Magazine. Vol. 25, no. 1. pp. 14–21.
- Thermos Ltd v. Isola Ltd, 27 RPC 388, 398-9 (High Court, England 1910).
- Thorne and others v. Owners of S.S. Asia, The London and China Telegraph (Admiralty Division 14 February 1883).
- Toland, Hugh J. (1881). "Annual Report of the Sealer of Weights and Measures for the Year 1880". Documents of the City of Boston for the Year 1881. Vol. I. City Council of Boston.
- "Trial of SAMUEL JONES (t17510523-49}". Old Bailey Proceedings Online. 1751.
- "Trial of JAMES TYRRELL , JOHN GAMMAGE (t18170115-41)". Old Bailey Proceedings Online. 1817.
- Twede, Diana (2003). Basket, Barrel and Box: The Secret Role of Crafted Wooden Containers in the History of Marketing. Proceedings of the Conference on Historical Analysis and Research in Marketing. Vol. 11. pp. 151 161.
- Ukers, William H. (1935a). All About Tea. Vol. 1. New York: The Tea and Coffee Trade Journal Co.
- Ukers, William H. (1935b). All About Tea. Vol. 2. New York: The Tea and Coffee Trade Journal Co.
- 'Uranium' (21 April 1876). "Organ Metal Pipe Manufacture". English Mechanic and World of Science. XXIII (578): 153–5.
- United States Tariff Commission (1954). "Report No. 192". Lead and Zinc Industries: Report on Investigation Conducted Under Section 332 of the Tariff Act of 1930 Pursuant to a Resolution by the Committee on Finance of the United States Senate Dated July 21, 1953. Washington: Government Printing Office.
- "Value of Silver Paper". Rugby Observer. 15 April 1928. p. 3.
- van der Voort, J.H. (1800). Kramers' Engelsch woordenboek: Engelsch-Nederlandsch en Nederlandsch-Engelsch. Gouda: van Goor Zonen.
- van der Weyde, P.H., ed. (August 1877). "Lead Manufacturing Operations". The Manufacturer and Builder. IX (8). New York: Austin Black: 172–3.
- van Driem, George (2019). The Tale of Tea: a Comprehensive History of Tea from Prehistoric Times to the Present Day. Leiden and Boston: Brill. ISBN 9789004393608.
- Very Old Colonist (1 September 1890). "Tea Packing, Bulking, &c". The Tropical Agriculturalist Monthly. Colombo: Ceylon Agricultural Society.
- Wansbrough, T. W. (1843). "Shield for Sore Nipples". Transactions of the Society, Instituted at London, for the Encouragement of Arts, Manufactures, and Commerce. 54: 144–151. JSTOR 41326912.
- Watson, Richard (1778). "Chemical Experiments and Observations on Lead Ore". Transactions of the Royal Society of London. 68: 863–883. JSTOR 106350.
- Whittaker, Arnold (1949). "The Development of the Tea Industry in India and Pakistan". Journal of the Royal Society of Arts. 97 (4800): 678–687. JSTOR 41364433.
- Whittingham, W.B. & Co. (1882). The Art of Tea Blending. A Handbook for the Tea Trade: A Guide to Tea Merchants, Brokers, Dealers and Consumers, In the Secret of Successful Tea Mixing. London: W.B. Whittingham & Co.
- Wilk, Richard (2008). "A taste of home: The cultural and economic significance of European food exports to the Colonies.". In Nützenadel, Alexander; Trentmann, Frank (eds.). Food and globalization: Consumption, markets and politics in the modern world. Oxford: Berg. ISBN 978-1-84520-679-6.
- Wolferine (March 1893). "Random Notes". The American Angler. Vol. 22, no. 6.
- Young, Egerton R. (1900). The Apostle of the North, Rev. James Evans. Toronto: R. Briggs.
- Zimring, Carl (2004). "Dirty Work: How Hygiene and Xenophobia Marginalized the American Waste Trades, 1870-1930". Environmental History. 9 (1): 80–101. JSTOR 3985946.
- Zimring, Carl A. (2005). Cash for Your Trash: Scrap Recycling in America. New Brunswick: Rutgers University Press. ISBN 978-0-8135-3686-6.

== External link ==
A description of the Chinese process for making tea lead, by Charles Alexander Bruce of the East India Company (1839)
