= Tin foil =

Thin, flexible sheet of tin

Tin foil, also spelled tinfoil, is a thin foil of or faced with tin. The term is also sometimes used to refer to aluminium foil, although this is avoided in technical contexts.

== History and use ==
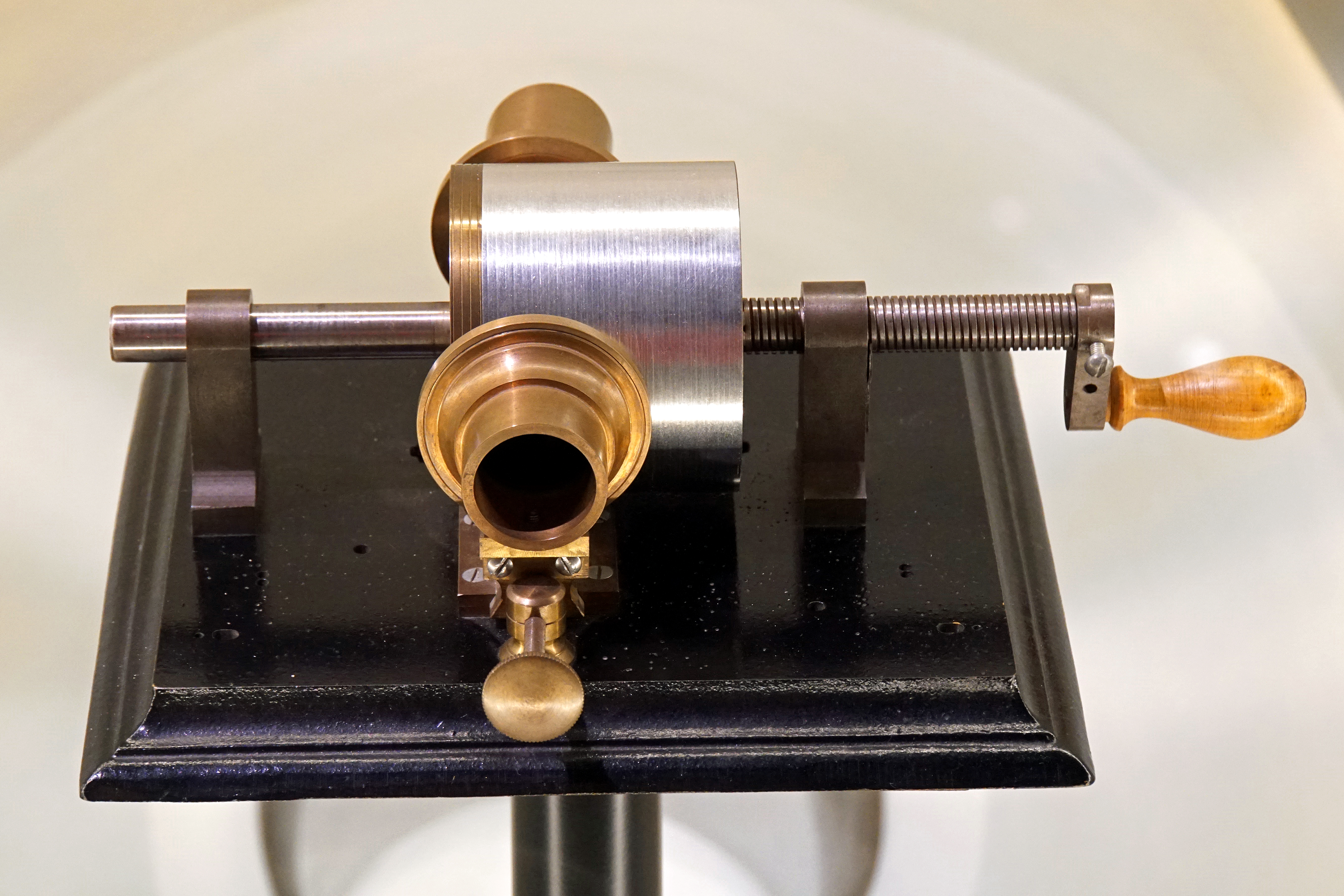
Tin foil phonograph

Tin has been manually worked since ancient times, and forged tin foil sheets, intended for decorative purposes, are known from the Eastern Zhou period in China (7th–5th centuries BCE). Much later examples of tin foil include 15th century English Yuletide decorations, and incorporation into 14th- to 16th-century Italian Renaissance paintings.

Tin foil became commercially available from the 19th century in England and the US, for wrapping, decoration and mirror backings. It was also used as a filling for tooth cavities and for phonograph cylinders for audio recordings.

After World War II, tin foil was largely replaced by cheaper and more durable aluminium foil, which is sometimes called "tinfoil".

== Tin foil hat ==
A tin foil hat is a hat made from one or more sheets of tin foil or aluminium foil, or a piece of conventional headgear lined with foil, worn in the belief or hope that it shields the brain from threats such as electromagnetic fields, mind control, and mind reading. The notion of wearing homemade headgear for such protection has become a popular stereotype and byword for paranoia, persecutory delusions, and belief in pseudoscience and conspiracy theories. Over time, the term has become associated with paranoia and conspiracy theories.

== See also ==
- Gold leaf
- Plastic wrap
- Sheet metal
- Wax paper
- Aluminium foil
- Tea lead
