= Official Board Markets =

Official Board Markets was a weekly trade publication for independent and integrated paperboard converters and mills, packaging buyers, paper recyclers, packaging end-users, and paper brokers. It was in circulation between 1925 and 2012.

== History and profile ==
Commonly known as the Yellow Sheet, the magazine was launched in 1925. It was used as a standard for both transacted containerboard pricing (linerboard and medium) and multiple grades of recovered paper stock pricing. It was also used to track linerboard prices as an economic indicator. The magazine was part of Magazines for Industry Inc. In 2009, Mark Arzoumanian was the editor-in-chief of the magazine. The headquarters was in Chicago.

The magazine was acquired by RISI in May 2012. In October 2012, Official Board Markets was merged with its sister magazine PPI Pulp & Paper Week. The last issue of Official Board Markets was dated 30 September 2012.
