= Corrugated box design =

Process of matching design factors for corrugated fiberboard boxes

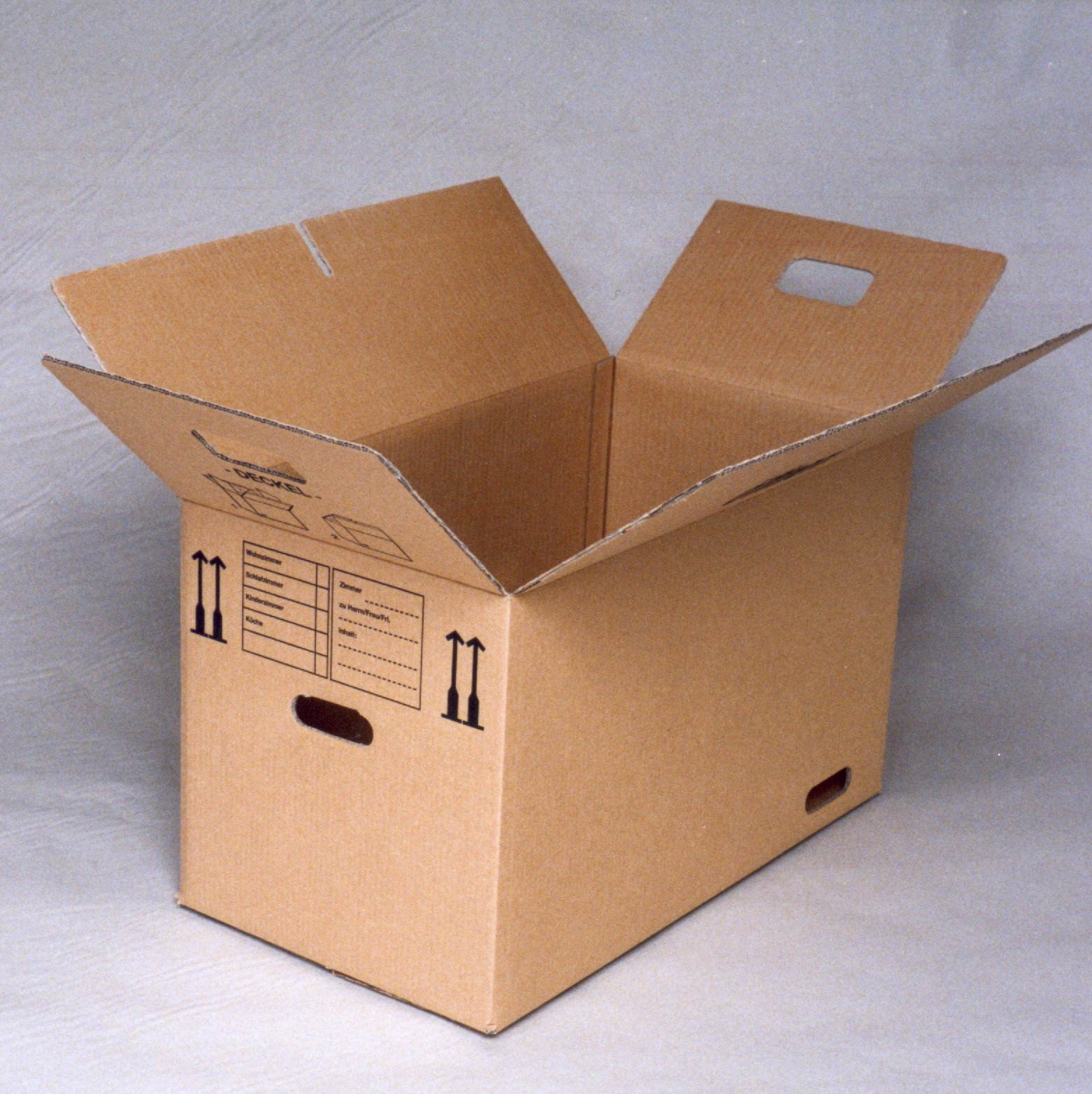
Partial overlap box with interlocking slots to temporarily close box

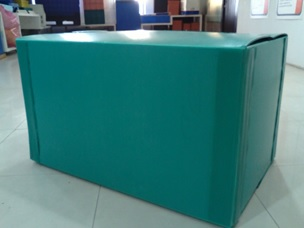
Corrugated plastic box used as reusable packaging

Corrugated box design is the process of matching design factors for corrugated fiberboard (sometimes called corrugated cardboard) or corrugated plastic boxes with the functional physical, processing and end-use requirements. Packaging engineers work to meet the performance requirements of a box while controlling total costs throughout the system. Corrugated boxes are shipping containers used for transport packaging and have important functional and economic considerations.

In addition to the structural design, printed bar codes, labels, and graphic design can also be important.

== Functions ==
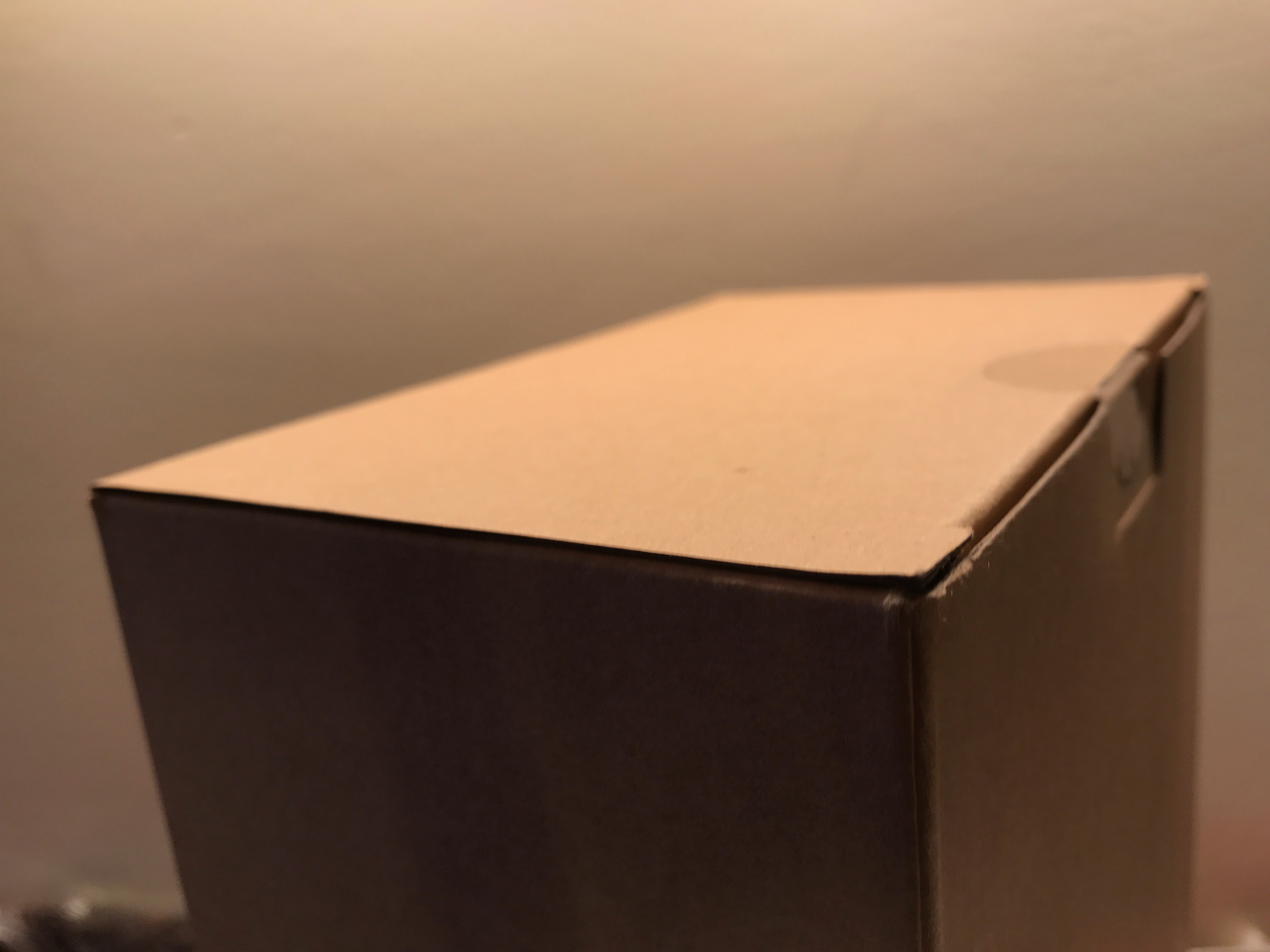
Microflute box with circular security tape seal

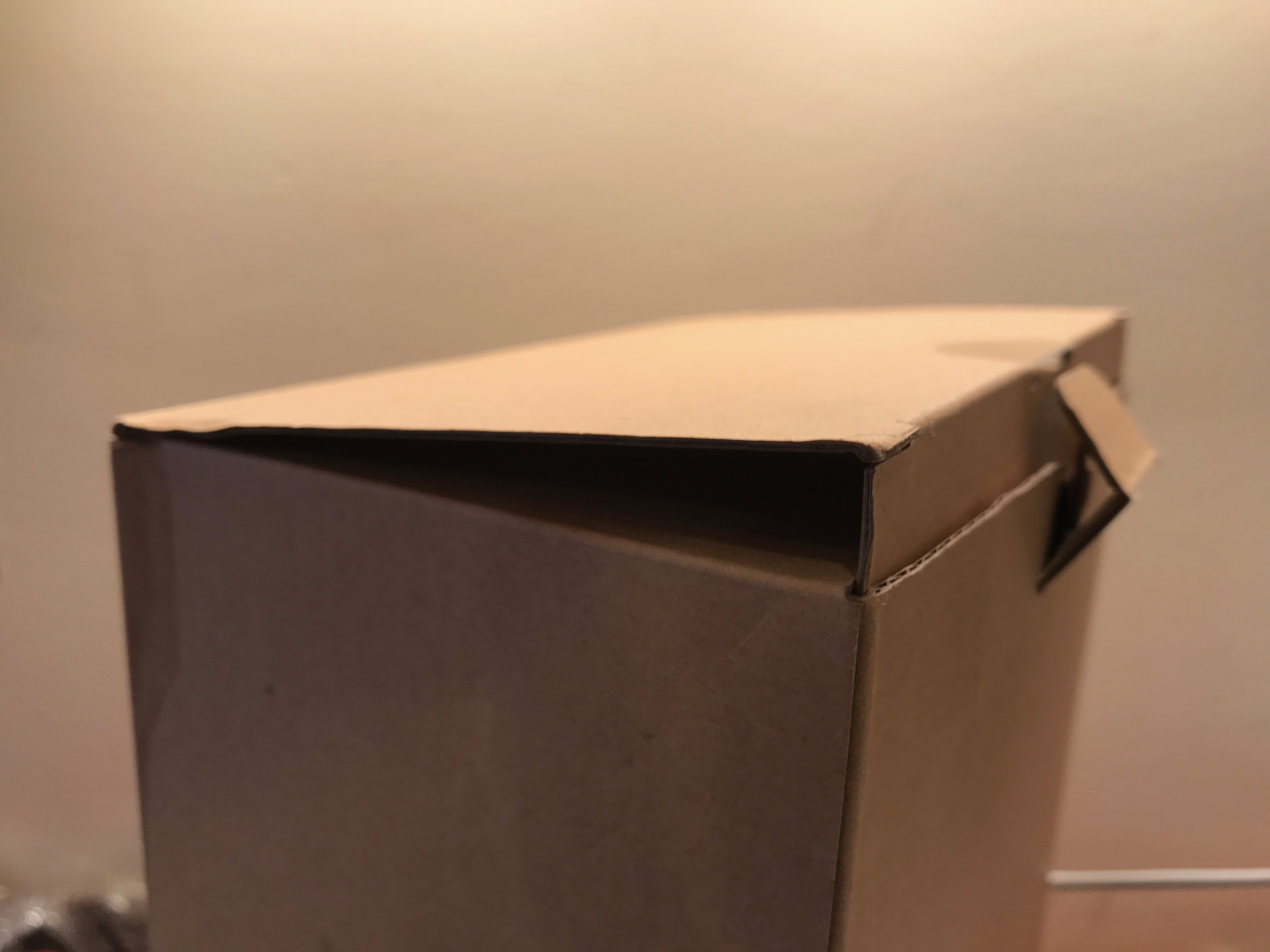
Partially open; showing tuck flap and locking tab (tongue)

Die-cut folder for flat items such as pizza

Corrugated boxes are used frequently as shipping containers. Boxes need to contain the product from manufacturing through distribution to sale and sometimes end-use. Boxes provide some measure of product protection by themselves but often require inner components such as cushioning, bracing and blocking to help protect fragile contents. The shipping hazards depend largely upon the particular logistics system being employed. For example, boxes unitized into a unit load on a pallet do not encounter individual handling while boxes sorted and shipped through part of their distribution cycle as mixed loads or express carriers can receive severe shocks, kicks, and so forth.

Ordinary shipping containers require printing and labels to identify the contents, provide legal and regulatory information, and bar codes for routing. Boxes that are used for marketing, merchandising and point-of-sale often have high graphics to help communicate the contents. Some boxes are designed for the display of contents on the shelf known as "Retail Ready Packaging". Others are designed to help dispense the contents. Popular for their strength, durability, lightness, recyclability, and cost-effectiveness, corrugated boxes are used for the shipping of a variety of items. Due to the quality and safety of packaging items in corrugated boxes, they are used widely in the food industry. The boxes handle the pressure that comes with stacking, making them ideal for easy transporting.

More than 95% of all products in the United States are shipped in corrugated boxes. Corrugated paperboard accounts for more than half of all the paper recycled in the US.

=== Stacking strength ===
One of the important functions of a corrugated box is to provide crush resistance (product protection) and adequate strength for stacking in warehouses. If long-term storage of corrugated boxes in high humidity is expected, extra strength and moisture resistance is called for. The method of loading boxes on pallets strongly affects stacking. Vertical columns provide the best box performance while interlocking patterns of boxes significantly reduce performance. The interaction of the boxes and pallets is also important.

A box can be designed by optimizing the grade of corrugated board, box design, flute direction, and inner supports. Support from the product also provides "load sharing" and can be an important factor. Box closures sometimes can have effects on box stacking strength.

Box compression testing is a means of evaluating boxes, stacks of boxes, and unit loads under controlled conditions. Field conditions of stacking and dynamic compression do not have the same degree of control. Compression strength can be estimated based on container construction, size, and use parameters: actual package testing is often conducted to verify these estimates.

=== Handling strength ===
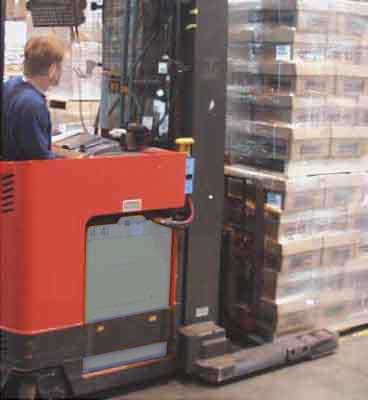
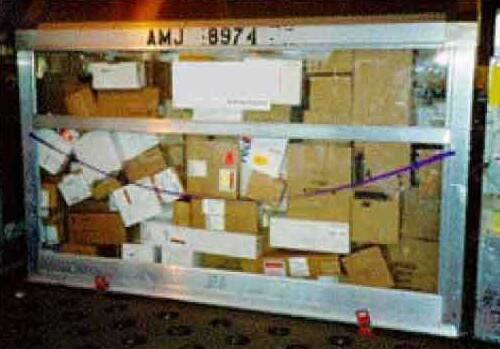
Box construction needs to be matched to its logistics system. Packages designed for controlled shipments of uniform pallet loads (left) may not be suited to mixed shipments with express carriers (right)

Many items are shipped individually (in part or entirely) by express carrier, mail, or other mixed logistics systems. The demands of multiple manual handlings, automated sortation, and uncontrolled stacking in trucks or air containers put severe stress on boxes, box closures, and the contents. Boxes designed for unit load handling and storage may not be suited to mixed logistics systems. Less than truckload shipping puts more stress on corrugated shipping containers than shipment by uniform pallet loads in trucks or intermodal containers. Boxes sometimes need to be heavier construction to match the needs of the distribution system. Package testing is often matched to the expected shipping hazards. ASTM International and the International Safe Transit Association test protocols reflect this.

=== Other factors ===
Several texts offer guidance on the box design process. The Wiley Handbook of Packaging Technology offers guidance on considerations and options. ASTM D5639 Standard Practice for Selection of Corrugated Fiberboard Materials and Box Construction Based on Performance Requirements discusses material choices and box structures which may be good options for specified package performance.

Depending on the contents, some corrugated boxes need extra stiffness or a heavier grade of board. Boxes with hand holes or handles sometimes need higher strength board, reinforcement attached with adhesives, or embedded fibers.

== Process ==
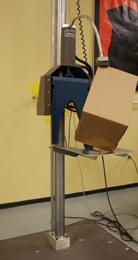
Laboratory drop test to determine ability to withstand rough handling

Several packaging texts discuss factors to consider in the design of packages. ASTM International has standards D6198, Standard Guide for Transport Packaging Design and D5639. Standard Practice for Selection of Corrugated Fiberboard Materials and Box Construction Based on Performance Requirements. These suggest factors including cost (materials, labor, capital), utility, package performance, machinability, marketing requirements, logistics factors, transport hazards (compression, impact, rupture, humidity, condensation, temperature, pilferage), regulations, and others.

Packaging engineers and designers start with the needs of the particular project: cost constraints, machinery capabilities, product characteristics, logistics needs, applicable regulations, consumer needs, etc. Often designs are made with Computer Aided Design programs for structural layout[ the files can be downloaded to automated sample-making tables. Several design and construction options might be considered.Samples are often submitted to package testing based on ASTM or other standard test protocols such as the International Safe Transit Association. Structural design is matched with graphic design. For consumer based designs, marketing personnel sometimes use Focus groups or more quantitative means of assessing acceptance. Test markets are employed for major programs.

The process starts by making corrugated board on a corrugating line, a long series of linked machines which may be the size of an (American) football field. A finished piece of single-wall corrugated board is a single corrugated layer sandwiched between two liners.

Skilled workers prepare job tickets for each stack of box blanks and route the blanks to fabrication machines. Printing dies and patterns are prepared on large, flexible, rubber or tin sheets. They are loaded onto rollers and the box blanks are fed through it, where each is trimmed, printed, cut, scored, folded, and glued to form a box. Finished boxes are then stacked and sent to a banding machine to be wrapped and shipped.

== Design ==
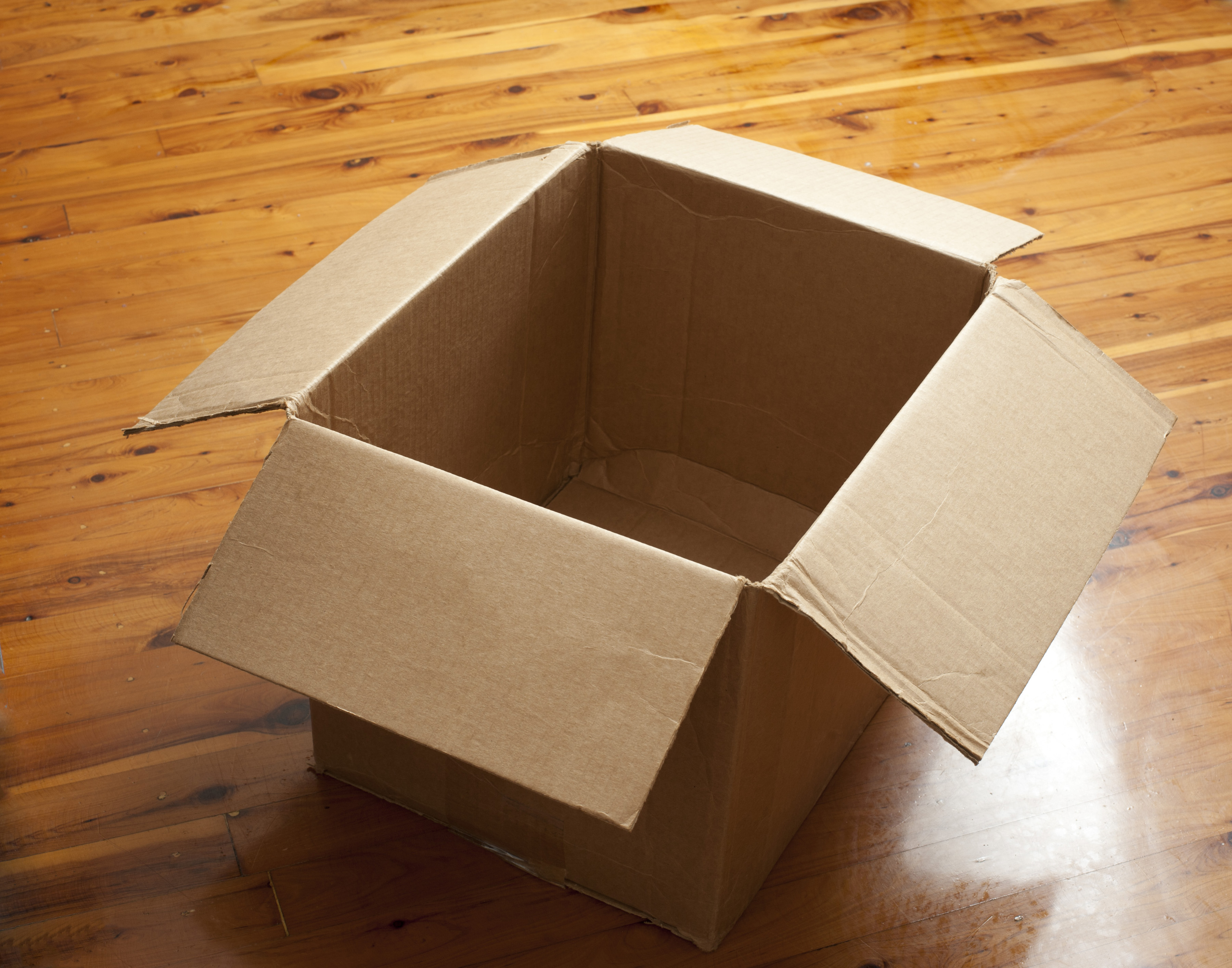
Regular Slotted Container (RSC)

Box blank for an RSC showing score lines, slots, and manufacturer's joint

The most common box style is the Regular Slotted Container (RSC). All flaps are the same length from score to edge. Typically the major flaps meet in the middle and the minor flaps do not, unless the width is equal to the length. The size of a box can be measured for either internal (for product fit) or external (for handling machinery or palletizing) dimensions. The manufacturer's joint is most often joined with adhesive but may also be taped or stitched. The box is shipped flat (knocked down) to the packager who sets up the box, fills it, and closes it for shipment. Box closure may be by tape, adhesive, staples, strapping, etc. Boxes are usually specified and ordered by the internal dimensions.Box styles in Europe are typically specified by a 4-digit code provided by the European Federation of Corrugated Board Manufacturers (FEFCO); an RSC is coded 0201.

Many other styles of corrugated boxes and structures are available. One common source is the Fibre Box Association:

- FOL (Full Overlap): A Full Overlap Box is similar to an RSC except the major flaps fully overlap. Full-overlap flaps provide extra stacking strength and edge protection.
- HSC (Half Slotted Container): Half-Slotted Containers (HSC) are similar to an RSC, but with only one set of flaps. They are useful when an open-top container is desired. HSCs can be used to create a telescope box.
- A Full Telescope Box has two fully telescoping sections. The sections may be formed by staples, die-cut locks, adhesive, etc.
- A Partial Telescope Box has two sections. The top telescopes partially over the bottom. Commonly used for holding printing paper.
- A Bliss box is a three piece box, usually with flaps meeting on the top
- A corrugated tray is often used for display purposes or used with a shrink wrap
- Corrugated corner pads can be used for product support and cushioning
- Special die-cut shapes have almost endless designs and uses.
- etc.

=== Examples of container designs ===
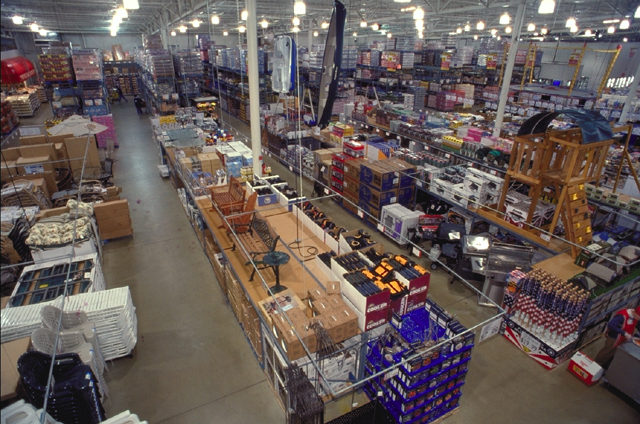
Wholesale outlet using full pallet loads

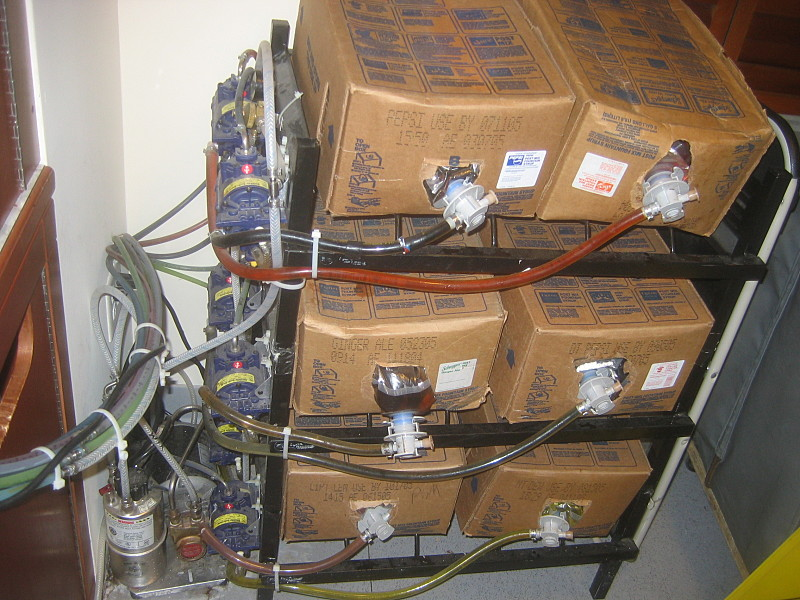
Bag-in-box containing liquids to dispense

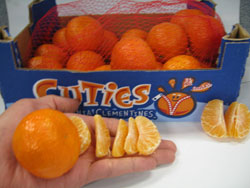
Box used for fruit packaging is open to allow respiration and access to cold chain. Tabs interlock when stacked on a pallet.

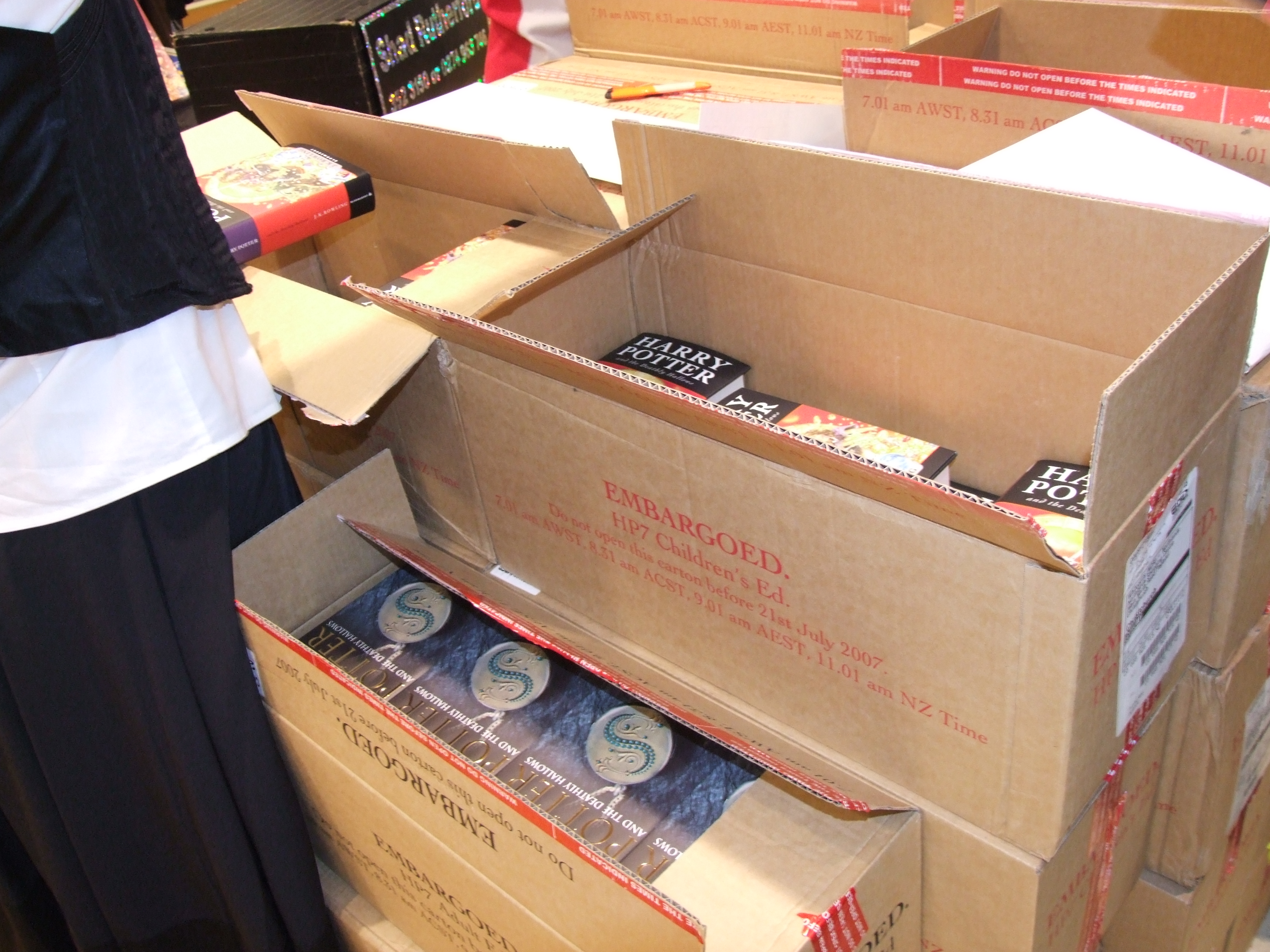
Boxes of books, with security tape used as a closure

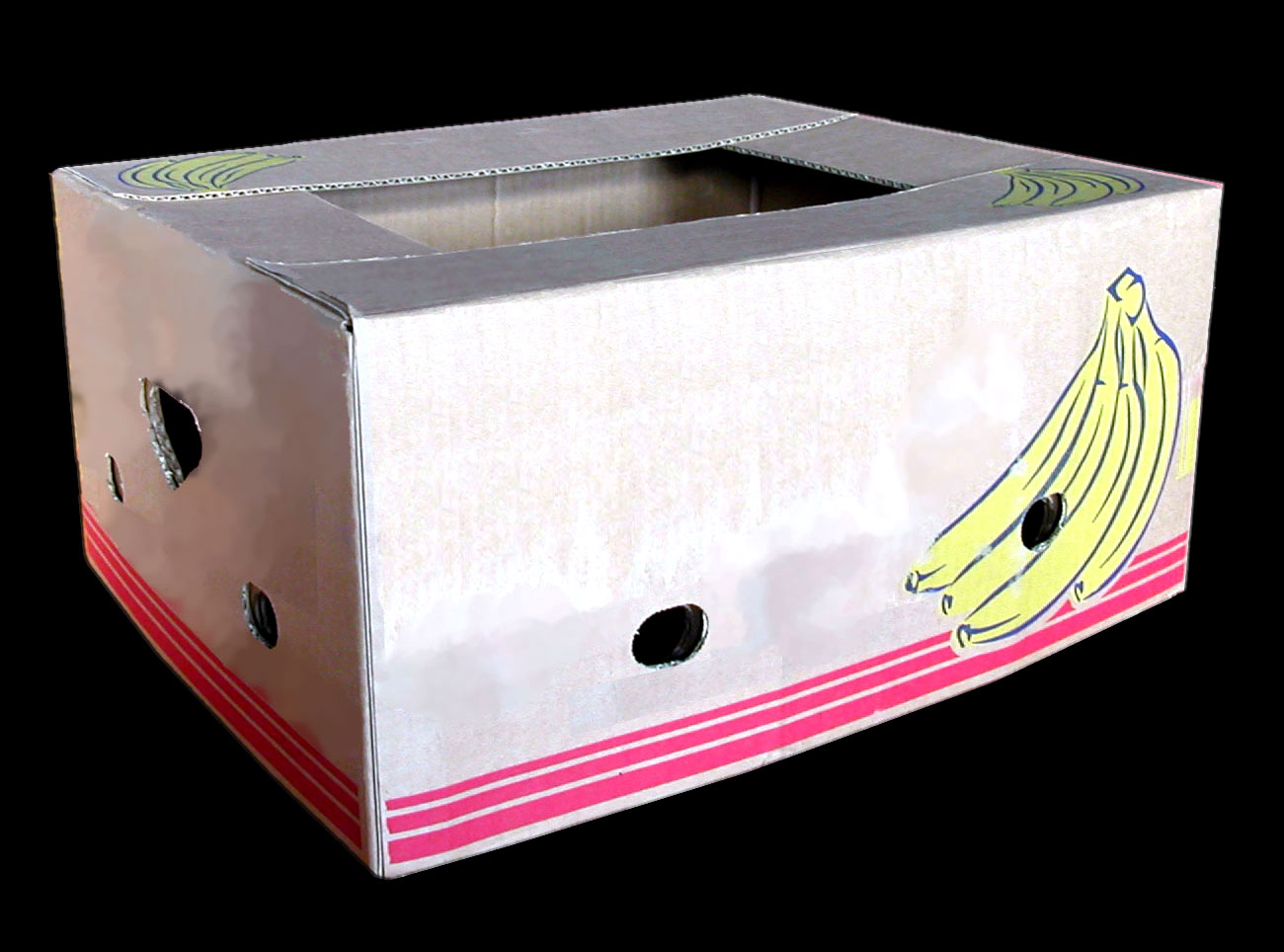
Telescope box with hand holes and ventilation holes (banana box)

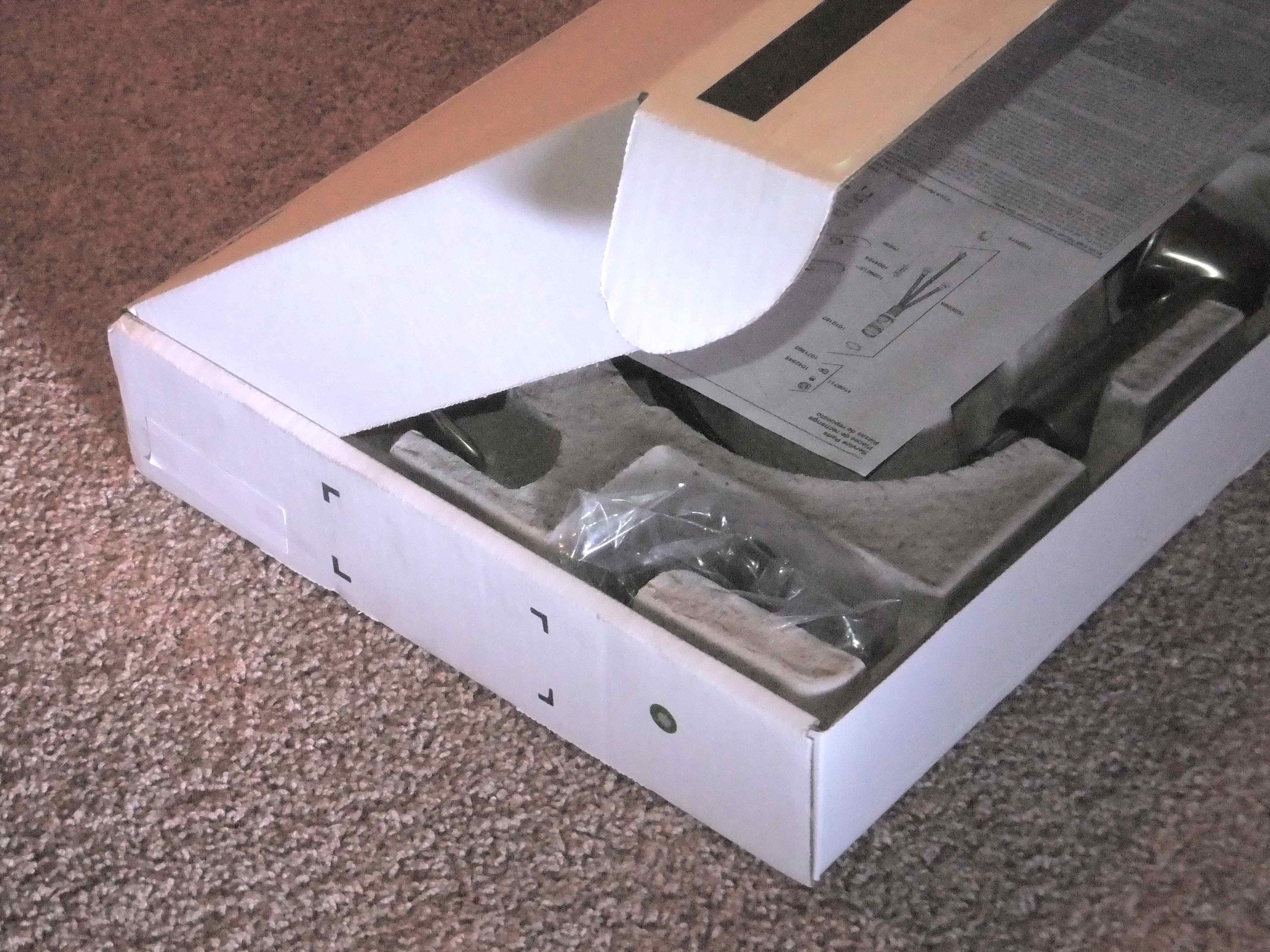
Die-cut folder for a faucet

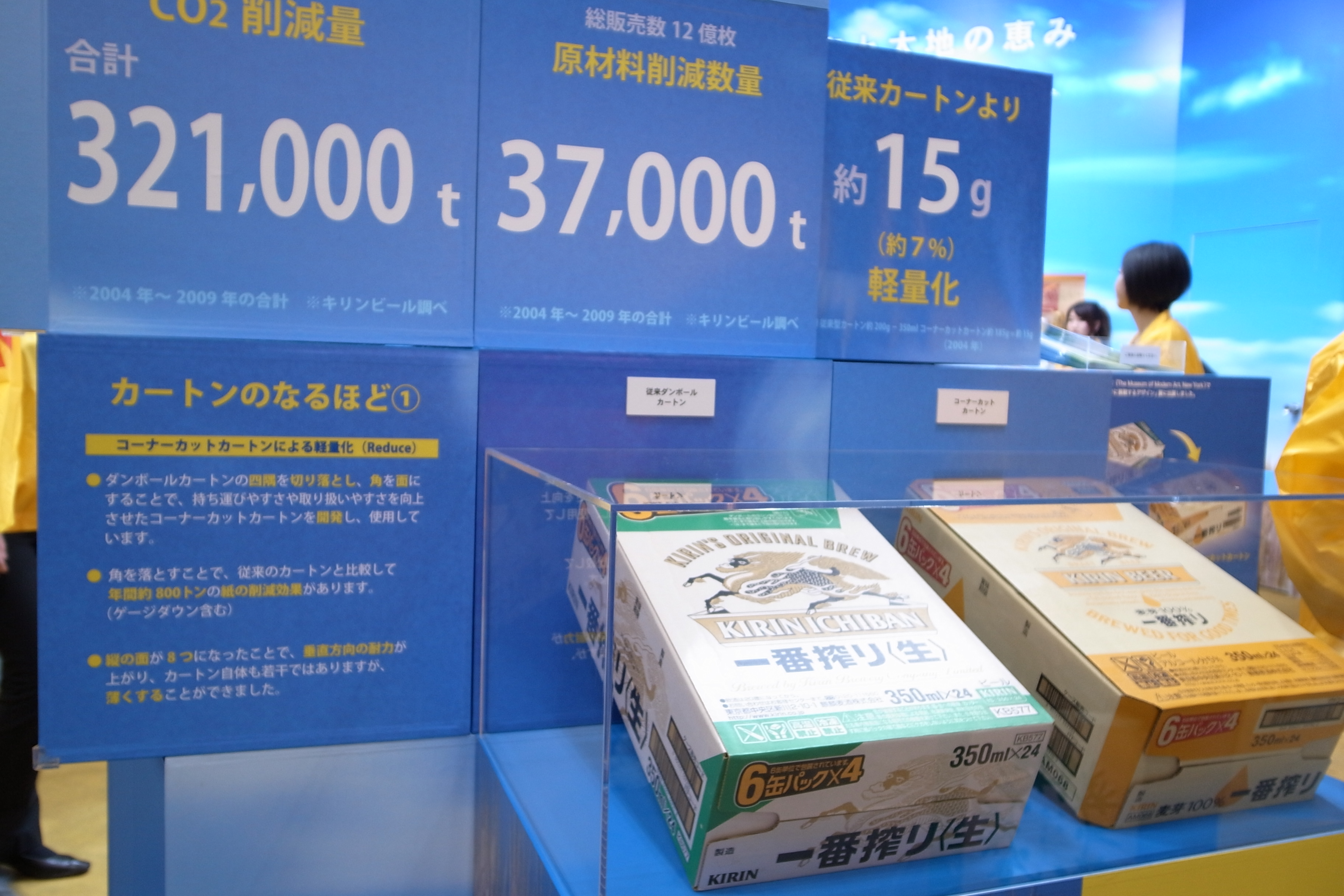
Corner cut carton for beverage cans

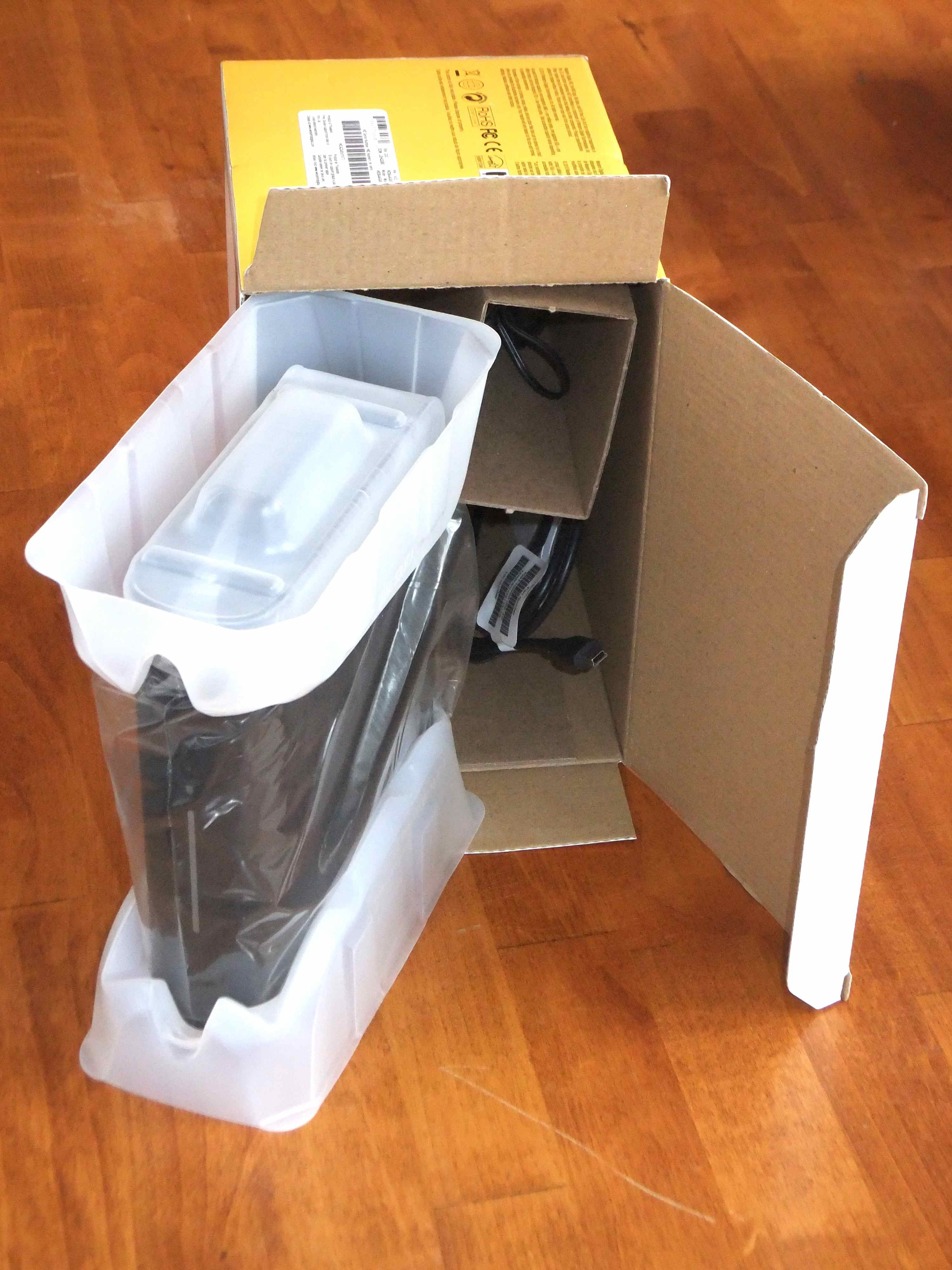
Corrugated box, inner corrugated support, and cushioning for hard drive

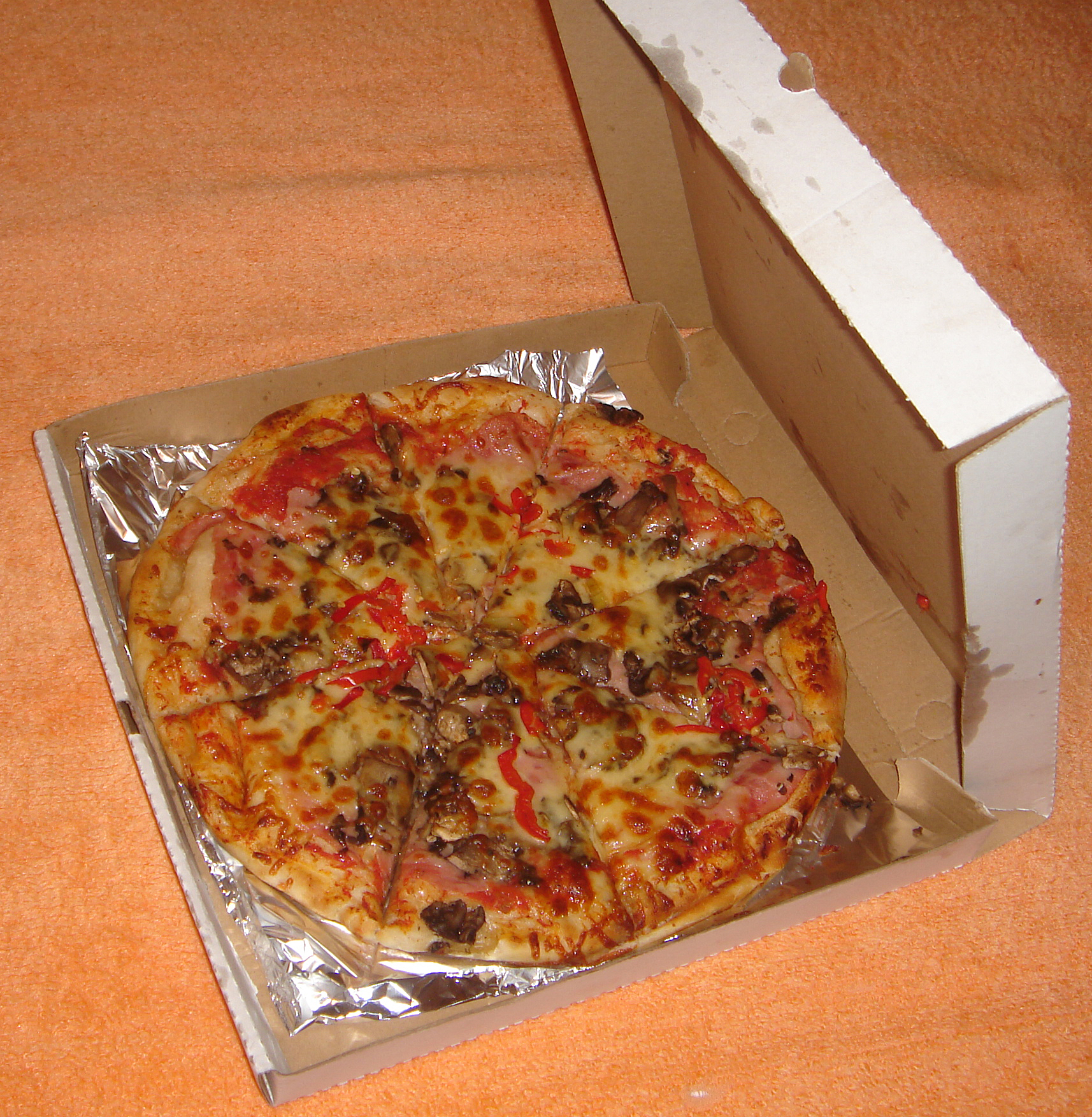
Take-out pizza in a die-cut folder

Display boxes for bottles of juice

== Retail display ==
Retailers often ask for merchandise to be delivered to them in shipping containers which allow the easy stocking of full caseloads. The goal is to put the case directly onto shelves and stocking locations without individually handling the unit packs or primary packages. Retailers often require products to come in shelf-ready packaging to reduce stocking costs and save labor expenses. Several specialized box designs are available.

== Government, military, and export ==
Many items being supplied to governments are handled very well: boxes are unitized, shipped on covered trucks or intermodal containers, and storage is in warehouses. Normal "domestic boxes" and commercial packaging are acceptable.

Military materiel, field supplies, and humanitarian aid often encounter severe handling and uncontrolled storage. Special box specifications for government shipments are often applicable. Weather-resistant fiberboards, box construction, box closure, and unitizing are needed.

== Dangerous and hazardous goods ==
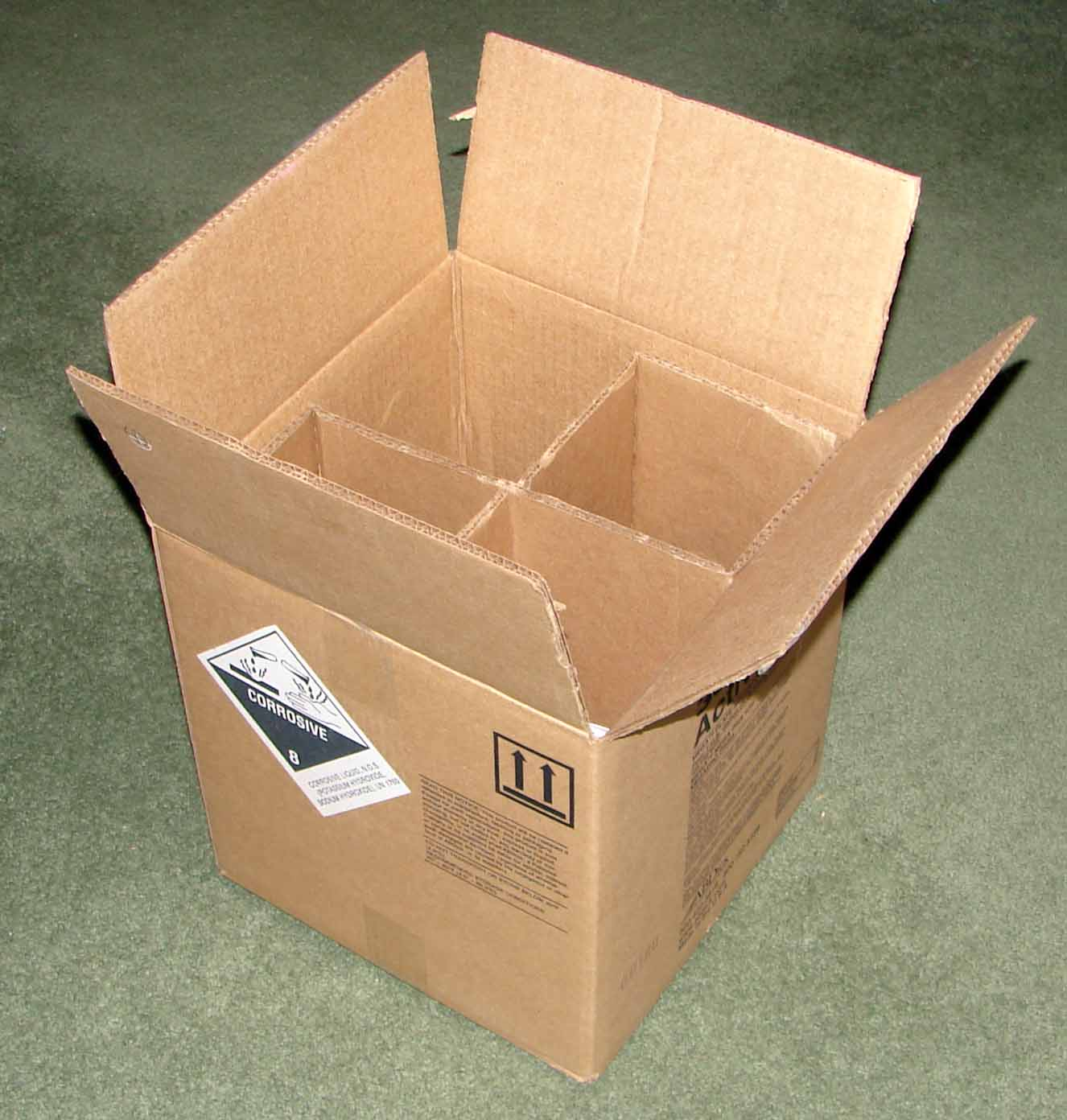
Doublewall box with dividers for shipping four bottles of corrosive liquid

Shipment of dangerous goods or hazardous materials are highly regulated. Based on the UN Recommendations on the Transport of Dangerous Goods model regulations, each country has coordinated design and performance requirements for shipment. For example, in the US, the Department of Transportation has jurisdiction and published requirements in Title 49 of the Code of Federal Regulations. Corrugated boxes are described in 4G requirements. Performance (severe drop test, etc.) needs to be certified for the box and contents.

Some carriers have additional requirements.

== Box closure ==
The means of closing a box is an important aspect of design. It is affected by the types of equipment available to production lines, the measured laboratory performance, the field performance, and the ability of end-users to easily and safely open the box.

Box closures include:

- Adhesive, water-based or hot-melt adhesive – Adhesives are applied manually or by machine. Starch-based adhesives are the choice of a corrugator as it is economical. Starch works as a medium for molds, lichens, and fungus, so to prevent it, antifungals are added to it before using it.
- Staples – staples are used to attach the box flaps. Small (nominally 1/2-inch crown) staples can be applied to a box with a post stapler. Wider crown (nominally 1 1/4-inch) staples can be applied with a blind clincher
- Box sealing tape, pressure-sensitive-tapes are available in various widths such as 36, 48, and 72 mm, and in several thicknesses. Biaxially oriented polypropylene (BOPP) and polyethylene terephthalate (PET) are used as a backing. Taping is done either manually or by semi-automatic Case sealer.
- Filament tape, reinforced pressure-sensitive tape used to close boxes.
- Gummed paper tape – consists of a heavy paper in which adhesive is activated by water and bonds the tape to the box.
- Reinforced water activated gummed tape. Two plies of paper with reinforcing filaments embedded between them.
- Strapping – straps are generally used for unitizing, usually made up of plastic (polypropylene (PP), polyethylene (PE), polyethylene terephthalate (PET), or polyvinyl chloride (PVC)) or metal (stainless steel) and available in various widths.
- Shrink wrap – done with a thin film of linear low-density polyethylene (LLDPE) or low-density polyethylene (LDPE) which shrink with the application of heat, resulting in the box or package being wrapped all the way around. Shrink wrapping is generally more expensive as it needs a hot tunnel and requires more material than the alternatives; however, the packed box will be better protected from the environment as the wrap works as a barrier.
