= Case sealer =

Equipment used for closing corrugated boxes

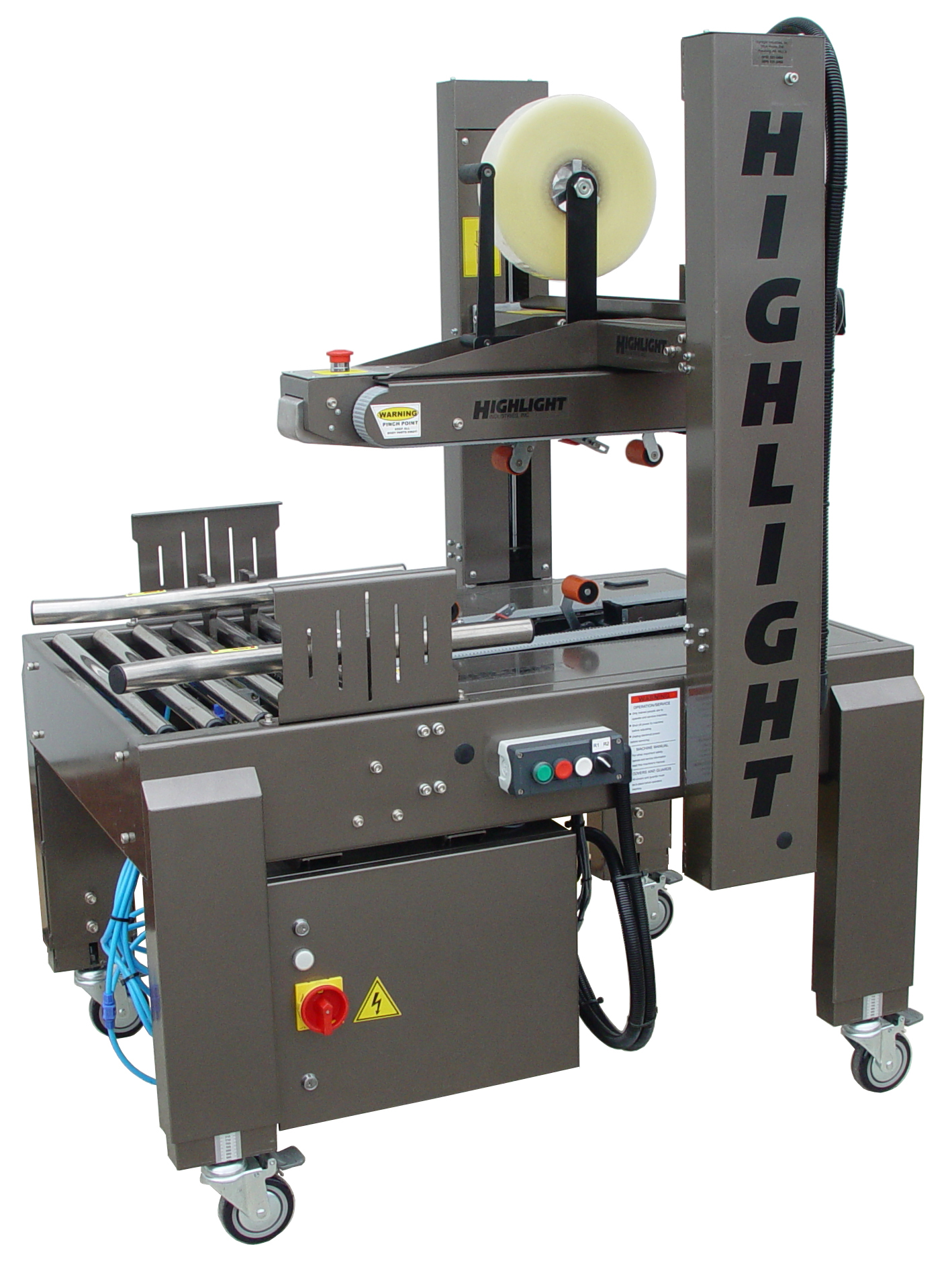
A semi-automatic box sealing machine

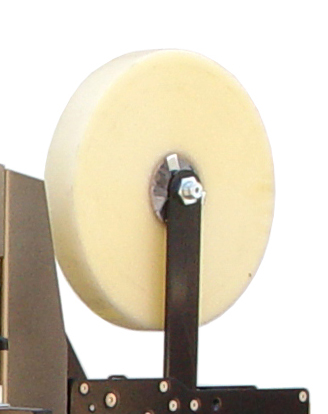
A large roll of box-sealing tape in the tape head of a case-sealing machine

A case sealer or box sealer is a piece of equipment used for closing or sealing corrugated boxes. It is most commonly used for regular slotted containers (RSC) and can involve adhesive (cold water-borne or hot melt adhesive), box sealing tape, or gummed (water activated) tape.

By contrast, a case erector is equipment for setting-up flat (knocked-down) corrugated boxes and applying a closure to the bottom flaps.

== Semi-automated ==
With semi automatic equipment, the operator typically fills and loads a box at the entrance to the case sealer; the box may or may not have the bottom flaps previously closed. The operator closes the top flaps and feeds the box in or through a machine which automatically applies the closure. This helps save time and controls the application of the closure materials such as box sealing tape.

== Fully automated ==
Fully automatic equipment is available which does not require an operator. All functions, including closing the flaps, can be automated.

== Other ==
Case sealers can also be categorized as either adjustable to fit production runs of a uniform box size or random, capable of handling a mixed variety of box sizes without machine adjustment.

Several machine design options have been developed.

== See also ==
- Box-sealing tape
- Automation
