= Box-sealing tape =

Type of adhesive tape

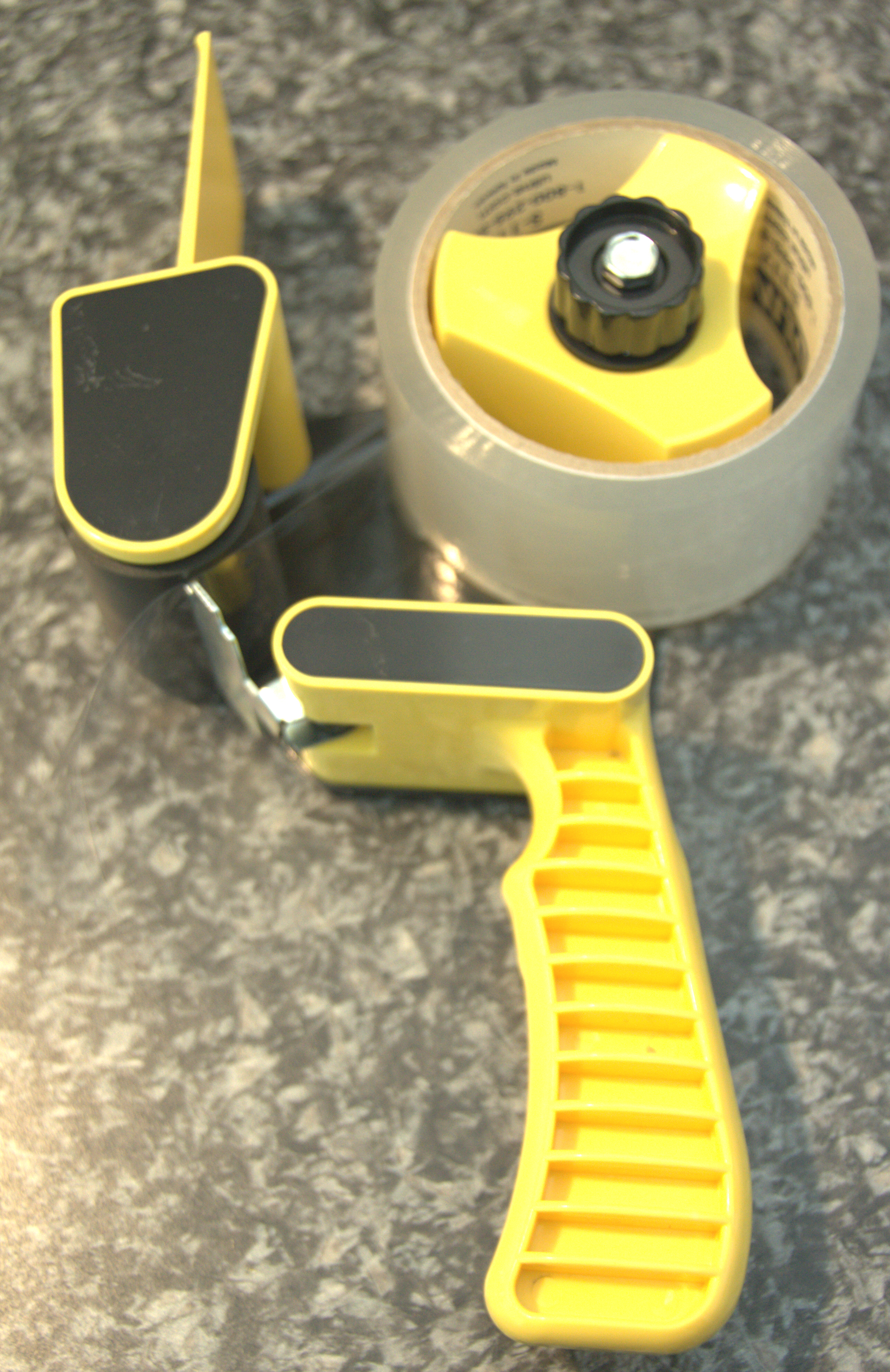
Common packing tape gun.

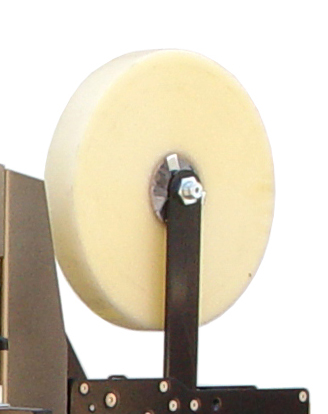
A large roll of box-sealing tape in the tape head of a case-sealing machine.

Box-sealing tape, parcel tape, packing tape, or shipping tape is a pressure-sensitive tape used for closing or sealing corrugated fiberboard boxes. It consists of a pressure-sensitive adhesive coated onto a backing material which is usually a polypropylene or polyester film which is oriented to have strength in both the long (machine) direction and the cross direction.

Common packing tape is 50 mm wide, but narrower and wider variants are also common, like for example 36 mm, 48 mm and 72 mm (approx 1.5 in, 2 in and 3 in). A variety of backing strengths and calipers as well as adhesive formulations are available. The thickness of the tape may be in the order of 40 μm for low strength, 45 μm for normal strength, or 50 μm and up for extra strength.

It is often transparent or tan (beige, buff, brown), but can be had in any color with or without prints and logos. The length of a roll varies, but can be around 50-70 meters.

== Uses ==
The tape is most often used as a closure for regular slotted containers (RSCs). A "single strip" or "center seam" closure is applied over the center seams of a box extending 50 to 75 millimetres (2 to 3 in) onto the end panels.

The tape can be used as a "six-strip" closure or "H-seal" by applying cross strips on the ends of the box. This is used when a relatively weak tape is used or when extra box reinforcement is needed. This method also seals the box to help keep contaminants out.

This tape has also been used by artists (e.g., Mark Jenkins) as a way to create molds of objects, as the strength of the tape allows for a strong shell for the mold when completed.

== Application ==
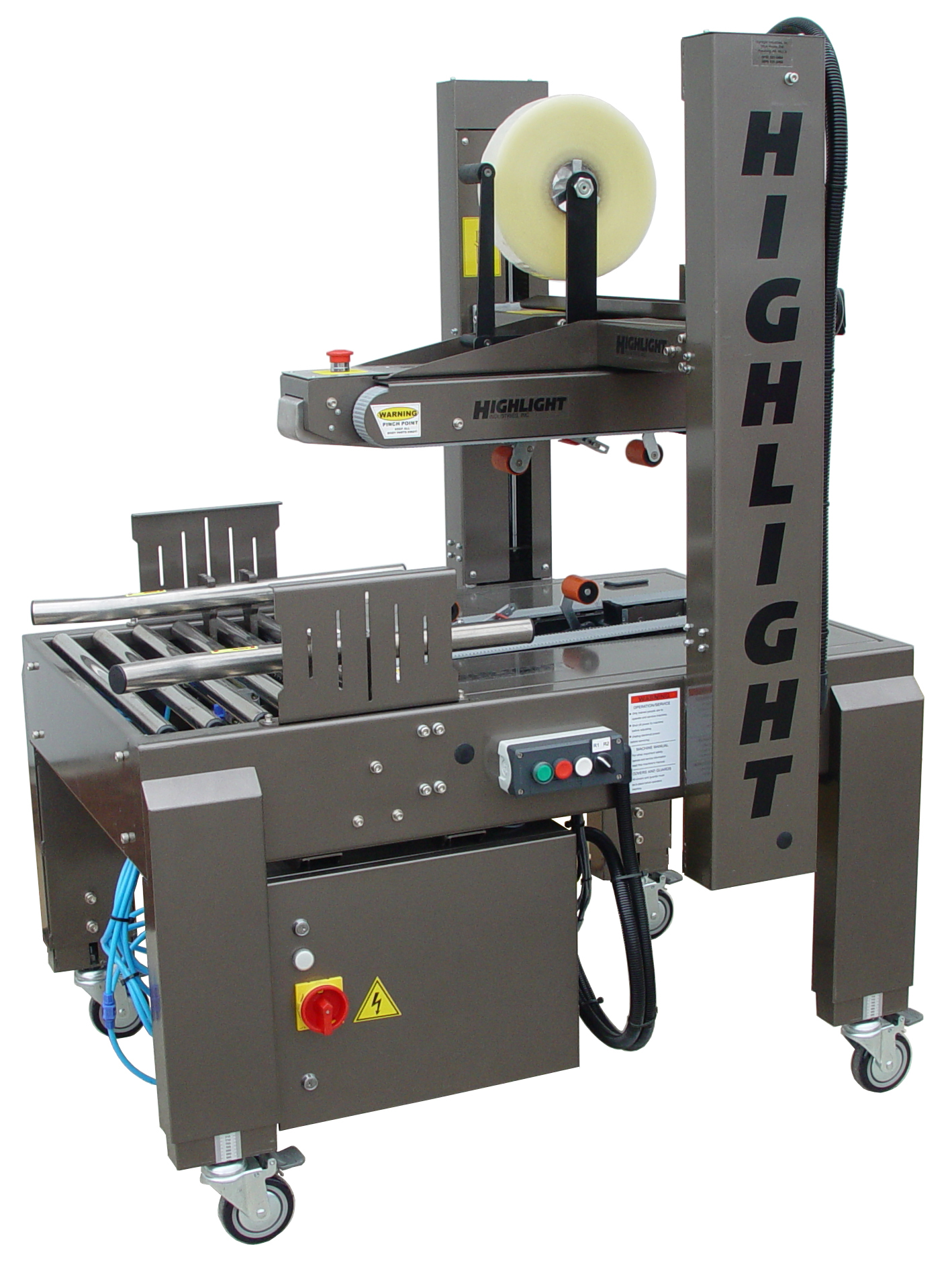
An automatic box-sealing machine.

The tape can be applied manually with a stationary dispenser but is more often applied with a hand-held tape dispenser: this allows the user to more efficiently place the tape on the box, cut it off, and rub it down.

Automated machinery for application of tape to high-speed lines is also common.

== Environmental considerations ==
Based on the solid waste hierarchy, the quantity and size of a tape should be minimized without reducing necessary functionality. Material content of a tape should comply with applicable regulations. Life cycle assessments of the tape and the item being taped are useful to identify and improve possible environmental effects. For example, there may be instances where the use of a PSA tape, compared to an alternative solution, improves the overall environmental impact: or vice versa.

If a tape remains on corrugated box during recycling, a tape should be chosen which does not hinder box recyclability. For example, when taped corrugated boxes are recycled, film backed box sealing tapes do not hinder box recycling: the PSA adhesive stays with the backing and is easily removed.

== See also ==
- Case sealer
- List of adhesive tapes
