= Container compression test =

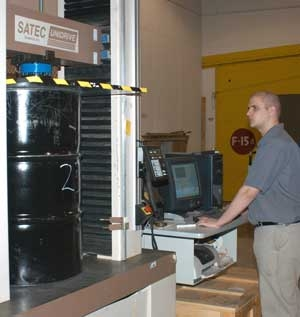
Compression test for steel drum

The container compression test measures the compressive strength of packages such as boxes, drums, and cans. It usually provides a plot of deformation vs compressive force.

It is commonly used to evaluate shipping containers made of corrugated fiberboard as well as wooden boxes and crates. Industrial and consumer packages other than boxes can also be subjected to compression testing: drum, pail, bottle, tub etc. Package components are also evaluated for compression resistance.

It is usually a laboratory test involving a special machine, a compression tester, to apply controlled compression on a test specimen. A universal testing machine is sometimes configured to perform a package compression test. Compression testing can also involve a superimposed dead load to a test package.

== Test procedures ==
A common method of conducting the test, as described in several published standard test methods, is to compress a box at a constant rate of 1/2 inch per minute (13 mm/min) between two rigid platens. The platens can be fixed so that they remain parallel or one can be pivoted or "floating". The test can be conducted on empty or filled boxes, with or without a box closure. Conditioning to standard temperature and humidity is important.

The results of the constant rate of compression test can be:

- The peak load
- The deformation at peak load
- The load at a critical deformation (head space, etc.)
- The ability of a container to protect the contents from compression damage
- etc.

The dynamic loads have some relationship with expected field loads.: often factors of 4 or 5 are used to estimate the allowable working load on boxes.

A test can also be conducted with platens that are not mechanically driven but are free to move with a fixed mass (or fixed force) loaded upon them. The results of static load testing can be:

- The time to failure
- The time to a critical deformation
- The ability of a container to protect the contents from compression damage
- etc.

As with any laboratory testing field validation is necessary to determine suitability.

== Corrugated box testing ==
Corrugated shipping containers are exposed to compression hazards during storage and shipment. Proper compression strength is a key performance factor.

=== Factors potentially affecting test results ===
- Size and construction of the specific shipping container under test
- Grade and flute structure of corrugated fiberboard
- Moisture content of the corrugated board (based on relative humidity)
- Orientation of the box during the test
- Inner supports, if used during testing (wood, corrugated board, cushioning)
- Contents (when box is tested with contents)
- Box closure
- Whether the compression machine has "fixed" or "floating" (swiveled) platens.
- Previous handling or testing of box
- Vent and hand holes
- etc.

=== Estimations ===
Corrugated fiberboard can be evaluated by many material test methods including an Edge Crush Test (ECT). There have been efforts to estimate the peak compression strength of a box (usually empty, regular singelwall slotted containers, top-to-bottom) based on various board properties. Some have involved finite element analysis. One of the commonly referenced empirical estimations was published by McKee in 1963. This used the board ECT, the MD and CD flexural stiffness, the box perimeter, and the box depth. Simplifications have used a formula involving the board ECT, the board thickness, and the box perimeter. Most estimations do not relate well to other box orientations, box styles, or to filled boxes. Physical testing of filled and closed boxes remains necessary.

=== Calculating compression requirement ===
Fiber Box Association have a method for calculating the required compression losses which includes the following factors:

- Time
- Moisture
- Palletizing type
- Pallet patterns
- Pallet type
- Handling

== Dynamic compression ==
Containers can be subjected to compression forces that involve distribution dynamics. For example, a package may be impacted by an object being dropped onto it (vertical load) or impacted by freight sliding into it (horizontal load). Vehicle vibration can involve a stack of containers and create dynamic compression responses. Package testing methods are available to evaluate these compression dynamics.

== See also ==
- Corrugated box design
- Corrugated fiberboard
- Package testing
- Plane strain compression test

== Relevant Standards ==
- ASTM Standard D642 Test Method for Determining Compressive Resistance of Shipping Containers, Components, and Unit Loads.
- ASTM Standard D4577 Test Method for Compression Resistance of a Container Under Constant Load
- ASTM Standard D7030 Test Method for Short Term Creep Performance of Corrugated Fiberboard Containers Under Constant Load Using a Compression Test Machine
- German Standard DIN 55440-1 Packaging Test; compression test; test with a constant conveyance-speed
- ISO 12048 Packaging—Complete, filled transport packages—Compression and stacking tests using a compression tester
