= Edge crush test =

Standard test of the strength of corrugated board

The edge crush test is a laboratory test method that is used to measure the cross-direction crushing of a sample of corrugated board. It gives information on the ability of a particular board construction to resist crushing. It provides some relationship with the peak top-to-bottom compression strength of empty singlewall regular slotted containers in laboratory conditions.

The edge crush resistance R, expressed in kilonewtons per meter (kN/m) is calculated by the equation: $R = 0.01 \times \overline{F}_\mathrm{max}$, where $\overline{F}_\mathrm{max}$ is the mean value of the maximum force and is measured in newtons. More details are laid down in ISO 3037.

Corrugated fiberboard can be evaluated by many material test methods including an edge crush test. There have been efforts to estimate the compression strength of a box (usually empty, regular singlewall slotted containers, top-to-bottom) based on various board properties. Some have involved finite element analysis. One of the commonly referenced empirical estimations was published by McKee in 1963. This used the board ECT, the MD and CD flexural stiffness, the box perimeter, and the box depth. Simplifications have used a formula involving the board ECT, the board thickness, and the box perimeter. Most estimations do not relate well to other box orientations, box styles, or to filled boxes.

In order to calculate the value of BCT (Box compression test), the formula of McKee would be the easiest but also the least accurate. The ratio of height to the circumference must be greater than 1:7; even then, are many reservations.

Simplified McKee formula:

${\color{Blue}BCT} = 5.876 \times {\color{Red}ECT} \times \sqrt{U \times d}$

BCT = Box compression test in Pounds
U = box outline in inch
d = thickness of corrugated board in inch
