= Corrugated fiberboard =

Composite paper material

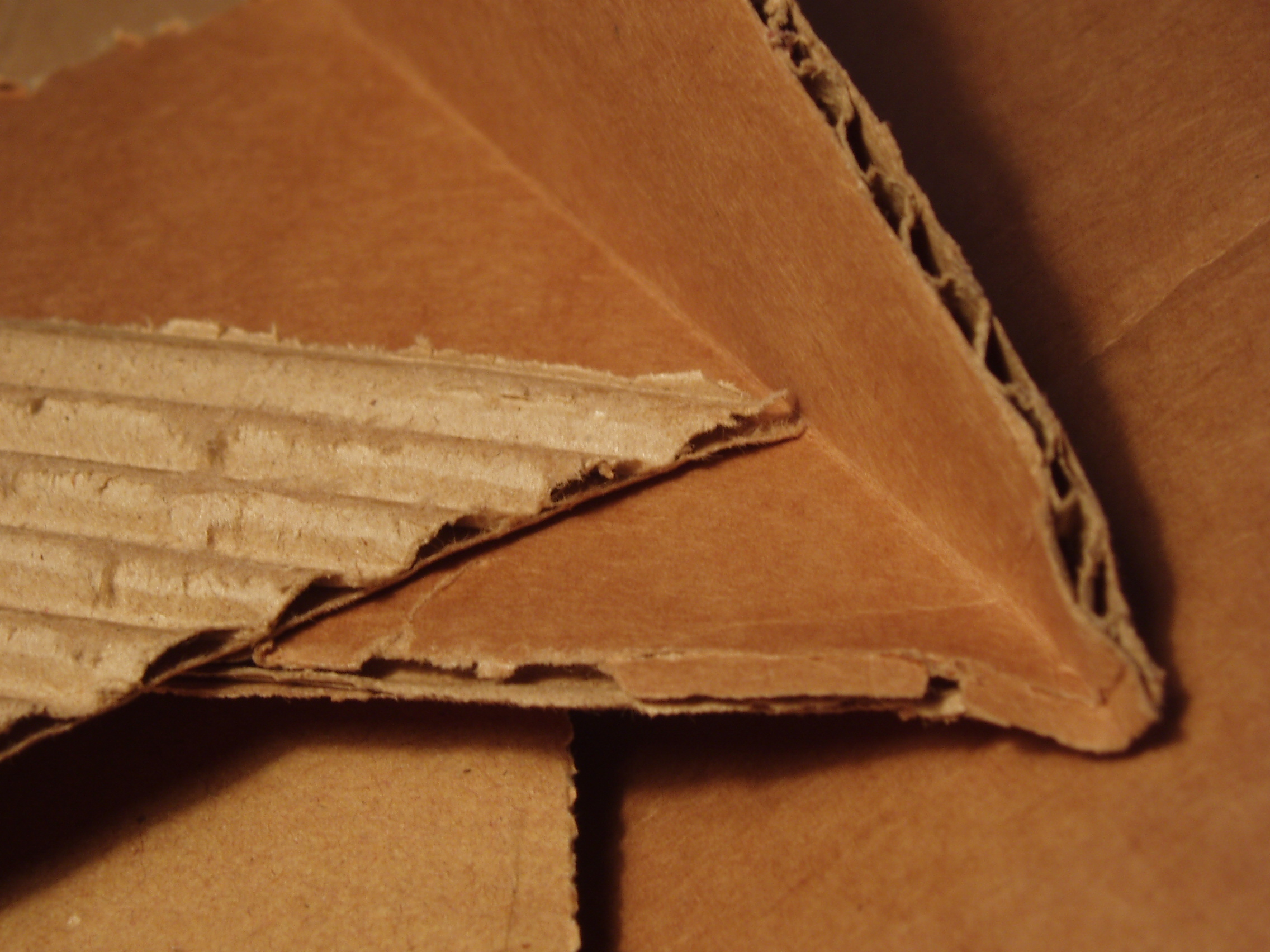
Corrugated board

Corrugated fiberboard, corrugated cardboard, or corrugate is a type of paper packaging material consisting of a fluted corrugated sheet and one or two flat linerboards. It is used for making corrugated boxes. Corrugated (also called pleated) paper was patented in England in 1856, but corrugated boxboard for use in shipping material was not patented until 1871. Several properties and characteristics can be measured for corrugated board, including moisture content and burst strength. Corrugated board is manufactured on large high-precision machinery lines called corrugators. Packaging engineers design corrugated boxes to meet the particular needs of the product being shipped. Old corrugated containers (OCC) are an excellent source of fiber for recycling.

== Description ==
Corrugated fiberboard is a type of packaging material consisting of a fluted corrugated sheet and one or two flat linerboards. It is made on flute lamination machines or corrugators and is used for making corrugated boxes. The corrugated medium sheet and the linerboard(s) are made of kraft containerboard, a paperboard material usually over 0.25 millimetres (0.01 in) thick.

== History ==
Corrugated (also called pleated) paper was patented in England in 1856, and used as a liner for tall hats, but corrugated boxboard for use in shipping material was not patented until 20 December 1871. The patent was issued to Albert Jones of New York City for single-sided (single-face) corrugated board. Jones used the corrugated board for wrapping bottles and glass lantern chimneys. The first machine for producing large quantities of corrugated board was built in 1874 by G. Smyth, and in the same year Oliver Long improved upon Jones' design by inventing corrugated board with liner sheets on both sides, thereby inventing corrugated board as it came to be known in modern times.

Scottish-born Robert Gair invented the pre-cut paperboard box in 1890 – flat pieces manufactured in bulk that folded into boxes. Gair's invention resulted from an accident. He was a Brooklyn printer and paper-bag maker during the 1870s. While he was printing seed bags, a metal ruler used to crease bags shifted in position and cut them. Gair discovered that by cutting and creasing in one operation he could make prefabricated paperboard boxes. Applying this idea to corrugated boxboard was a straightforward development when the material became available in the early-20th century.

The corrugated box was first used for packaging glass and pottery containers. In the mid-1950s, the corrugated fiberboard case enabled fruit and produce to be shipped from farm to retailer without bruising, improving the return to producers and opening export markets.

== Properties ==
Several properties and characteristics can be measured for corrugated board. Some of these include:

- Moisture content ranges from 6.5 to 9.5%. If moisture is below a certain limit it will cause cracking in corrugated board and if it is above then it will reduce the compression strength of board.
- Edge crush test measures force per unit width and predicts Box compression strength. It is reported in kN/m or lb/inch.
- Burst strength is the pressure required to rupture corrugated sheet. It is reported in kPa or lb/inch2.
- Box Compression strength is the direct measurement of performance of corrugated boxes. It is reported in kgf or N.
- Flat crush test measures flutes rigidity and reported in kPa.
- Bending resistance
- Impact resistance
- Cushioning, shock absorption
- Tear resistance
- Grammage is the weight per meter square of any material. It is reported in g/m2

Corrugated fiberboard is anisotropic; many of its properties are highly directional. For example, edge crush, bending stiffness, tensile, and surface characteristics are different, depending on the orientation to the flutes and the machine direction of manufacture.

== Manufacturing ==
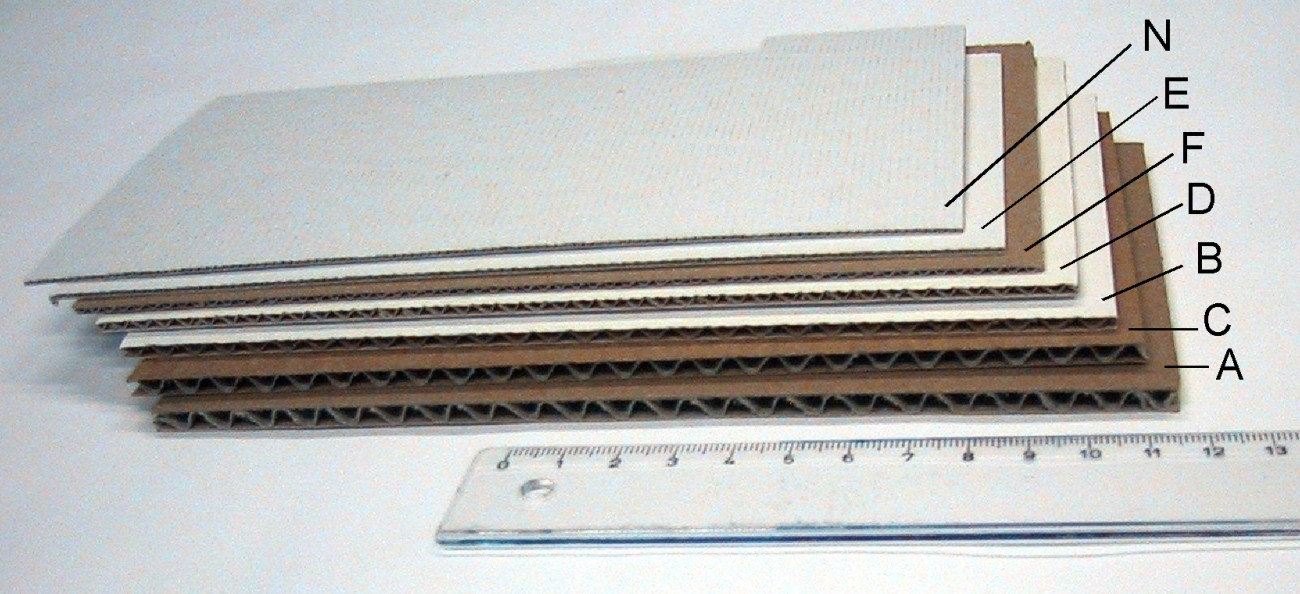
Main flutes for corrugated fiberboard

Corrugated board is manufactured on large high-precision machinery lines called corrugators, usually running at about 500 feet per minute (150 m/min) or more. These machines, over time, have become very complex with the objective of avoiding some common problems in corrugated board production, such as warp and washboarding.

The key raw material in corrugating is paper, different grades for each layer making up the corrugated box. Due to supply chain and scale considerations, paper is produced in separate plants called paper mills. Most corrugating plants keep an inventory of paper reels.

In the classical corrugator, the paper is softened with high-pressure steam. After the board is formed it is dried in the so-called dry-end. Here the newly formed corrugated board is heated from the bottom by hot plates. On the top, various pressures are applied by a load system on the belt.

The corrugated medium is often 0.026 pounds per square foot (130 grams per square metre) basis weight in the US; in the UK, a 90 grams per square metre (0.018 lb/sq ft) fluting paper is common. At the single-facer, it is heated, moistened, and formed into a fluted pattern on geared wheels. This is joined to a flat linerboard with a starch based adhesive to form single face board. At the double-backer, a second flat linerboard is adhered to the other side of the fluted medium to form single wall corrugated board. Linerboards are test liners (recycled paper) or kraft paperboard (of various grades). The liner may be bleached white, mottled white, colored, or preprinted.

Common flute sizes are "A", "B", "C", "E" and "F" or microflute. The letter designation relates to the order that the flutes were invented, not the relative sizes. Flute size refers to the number of flutes per linear foot, although the actual flute dimensions for different corrugator manufacturers may vary slightly. Measuring the number of flutes per linear foot is a more reliable method of identifying flute size than measuring board thickness, which can vary due to manufacturing conditions. The most common flute size in corrugated boxes is "C" flute.

Finer flutes such as E and F flutes provide smoother printing surfaces for high-resolution graphics, making them widely adopted for custom retail packaging and mailer boxes.

Standard US corrugated flutes
Flute designation	Flutes per foot	Flute thickness (in)	Flutes per meter	Flute thickness (mm)
A flute	33 ± 3	3/16	108 ± 10	4.8
B flute	47 ± 3	1/8	154 ± 10	3.2
C flute	39 ± 3	5/32	128 ± 10	4.0
E flute	90 ± 4	1/16	295 ± 13	1.6
F flute	125 ± 4	1/32	420 ± 13	0.8

Corrugated fiberboard can be specified by the construction (single face, singlewall, doublewall, etc.), flute size, burst strength, edge crush strength, flat crush, basis weights of components (pounds per thousand square feet, grams per square meter, etc.), surface treatments and coatings, etc. TAPPI and ASTM test methods for these are standardized.

The choice of corrugated medium, flute size, combining adhesive, and linerboards can be varied to engineer a corrugated board with specific properties to match a wide variety of potential uses. Double and triple-wall corrugated board is also produced for high stacking strength and puncture resistance.

Most corrugators are two knife corrugators, which means that they can produce two different sheet lengths side-by-side. This leads to an optimisation problem, known as the cutting stock problem.

== Box manufacture process ==
=== Box design ===
Packaging engineers design corrugated boxes to meet the particular needs of the product being shipped, the hazards of the shipping environment (shock, vibration, compression, moisture, etc.), and the marketing needs of retailers and consumers.

The most common box style is the Regular Slotted Container (RSC). All flaps are the same length from the score to the edge. Typically, the longer major flaps meet in the middle and the minor flaps do not. However, with the rise of E-commerce and a more competitive retail environment, box designs are becoming more dynamic and functional, straying away from typical shipping box designs.

The manufacturer's joint is most often joined with adhesive but may also be taped or stitched. The box is shipped flat (knocked down) to the packager who sets up the box, fills it, and closes it for shipment. Box closure may be by tape, adhesive, staples, strapping, etc.

The size of a box can be measured for either internal (for product fit) or external (for handling machinery or palletizing) dimensions. Boxes are usually specified and ordered by the internal dimensions.

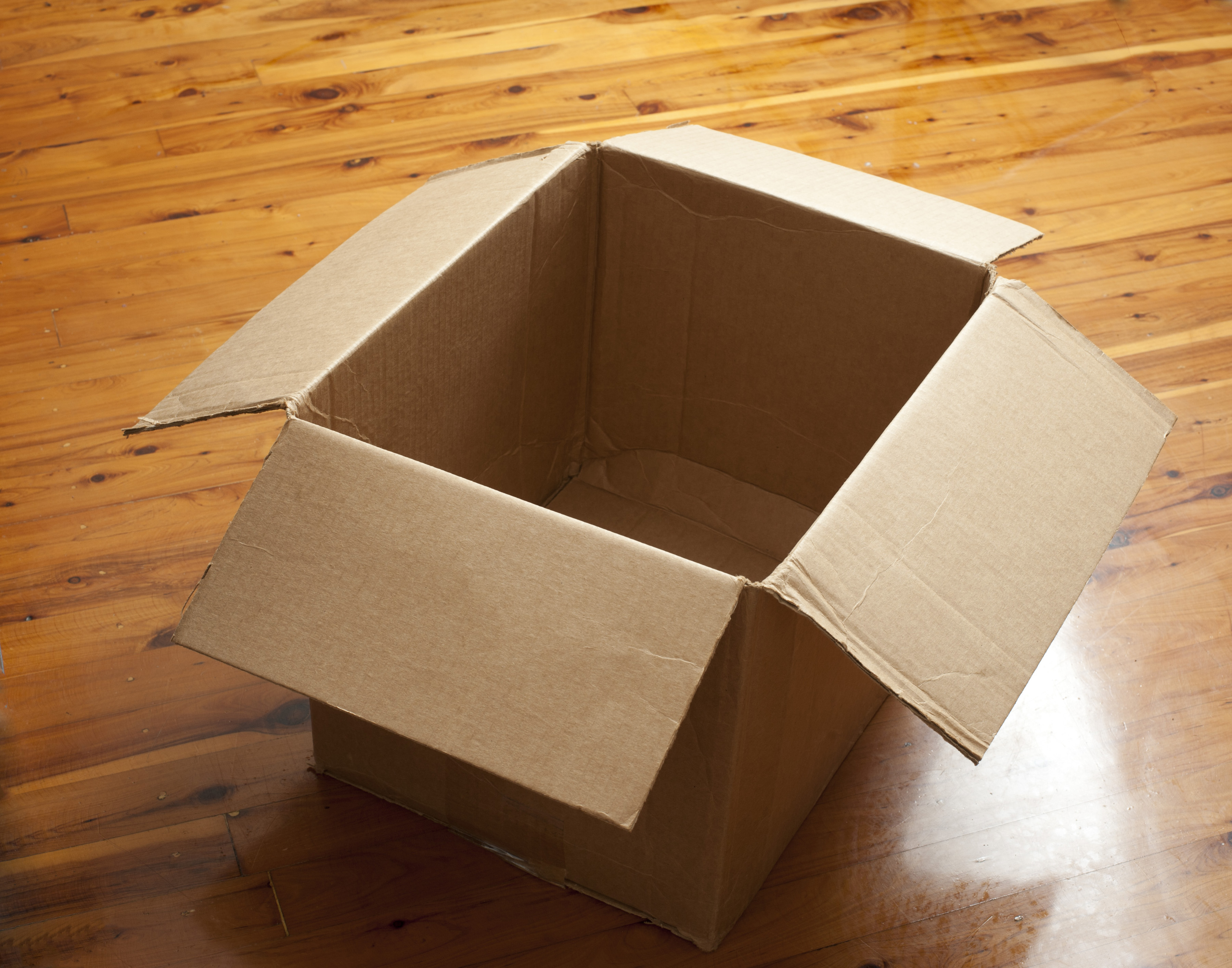
Regular Slotted Container (RSC)

RSC blank showing score lines, slots, and manufacturer's joint at the leftmost edge

=== Box maker's certificate ===
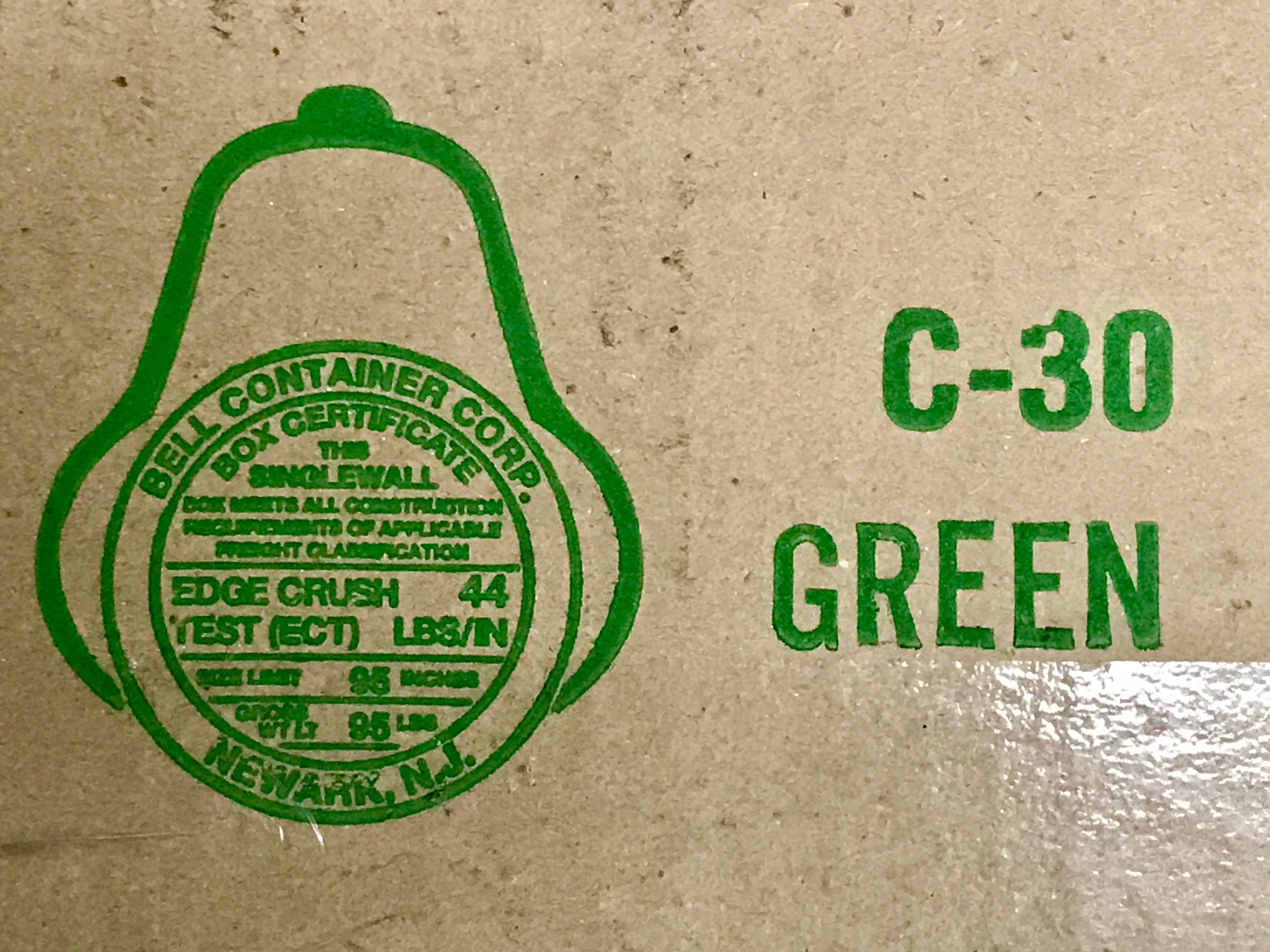
A box maker's certificate is typically printed on what will become the underside of the box.

A box maker's certificate (also known as "box certificate", or "box certificate of maker") is a seal printed on an outside surface, typically the bottom of the box, that includes some information about how strong the box is. The certificate is not required, but if used, it implies compliance with regulations relating to the certificate. Significant information includes:

- Bursting Test or Edge Crush Test
- Size Limit (the maximum outside dimensions of a finished box when the length, width and depth of the box are added together)
- Gross Weight Limit

=== Manufacturing ===
Boxes can be formed in the same plant as the corrugator. Such plants are known as "integrated plants". Part of the scoring and cutting takes place in-line on the corrugator. Alternatively, sheets of corrugated board may be sent to a different manufacturing facility for box fabrication; these are sometimes called "sheet plants" or "converters".

The corrugated board is creased or scored to provide controlled bending of the board. Most often, slots are cut to provide flaps on the box. Scoring and slotting can also be accomplished by die-cutting. Along with the print being produced on the box in these plants. These conversions are produced on different machines, depending on the conversion being made: "Flexo Folder Gluers (FFG)", "Rotary Die Cutters (RDC), "Printer Slotters" or " Printing Presses".

=== Single-face laminate ===
A limitation of common corrugated material has been the difficulty in applying fine graphic print for informative and marketing purposes. The reasons for this stem from the fact that prefabricated corrugated sheets are relatively thick and spongy, compared to the thin and incompressible nature of solid fibre paper such as paperboard. Due to these characteristics of corrugated, it has been mainly printed using a flexographic process, which is by nature a coarse application with loose registration properties.

A more recent development popular in usage is a hybrid product featuring the structural benefits of corrugated combined with the high-graphics print of lithography previously restricted to paperboard folding cartons. This application, generally referred to as "Single-Face Laminate" (SFL), begins its process as a traditional fluted medium adhered to a single linerboard (single-face), but in place of a second long-fibered liner, a pre-printed sheet of paperboard such as SBS (solid bleached sulfate) is laminated to the outer facing. The sheet can then be converted with the same processes used for other corrugated manufacturing into any desired form.

Specialized equipment is necessary for the material construction of SFL, so users may expect to pay a premium for these products. However, this cost is often offset by the savings over a separate paperboard sleeve and the labor necessary to assemble the completed package.

== Recycling ==
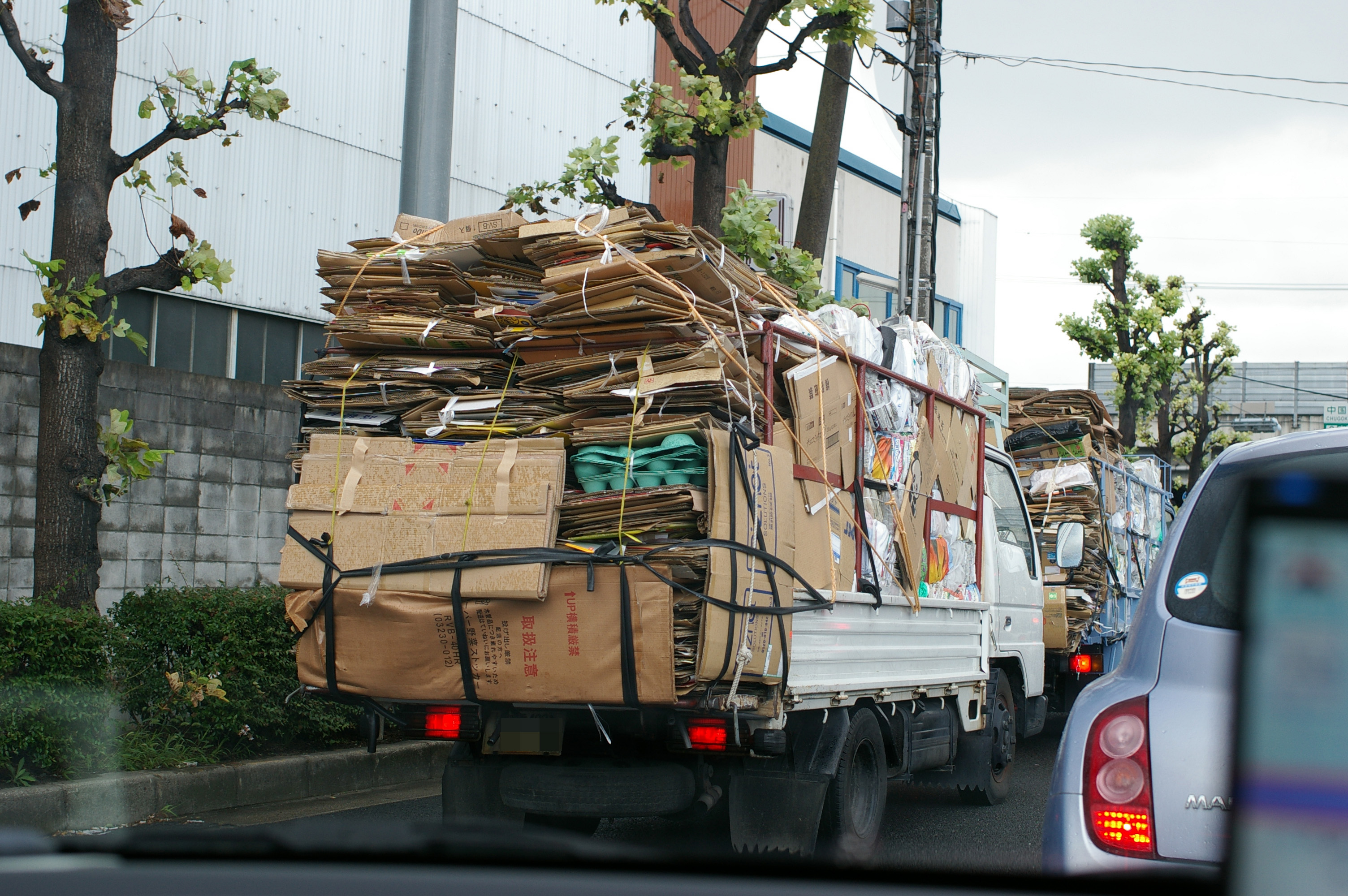
Used boxes bundled for recycling

Old corrugated containers (OCC) are an excellent source of fiber for recycling. They can be compressed and baled for cost effective transport. The baled boxes are put in a hydropulper, which is a large vat of warm water for cleaning and processing. The pulp slurry is then used to make new paper and fiber products.

Mill and corrugator scrap, or "broke", is the cleanest source for recycling. The high rates of post-consumer recycling reflect the efficiency of recycling mills to clean and process the incoming materials. Several technologies are available to sort, screen, filter, and chemically treat the recycled paper.

Many extraneous materials are readily removed. Twine, strapping, etc. are removed from the hydropulper by a "ragger". Metal straps and staples can be screened out or removed by a magnet. Film-backed pressure-sensitive tape stays intact: the PSA adhesive and the backing are both removed together.

Materials which are more difficult to remove include wax coatings on corrugated boxes and "stickies", soft rubbery particles which can clog the paper maker and contaminate the recycled paper. Stickies can originate from book bindings, hot melt adhesives, pressure-sensitive adhesives from paper labels, laminating adhesives of reinforced gummed tapes, etc.

Corrugated fiberboard shredders are now available which convert post-consumer corrugated board into packing/cushioning materials by means of a specialized shredding process.

== ASTM standards ==
The following standards are in practice among others:

- D1974 Standard Practice for Methods of Closing, Sealing and Reinforcing Fiberboard Boxes
- D4727 Standard Specification for Corrugated and Solid Fiberboard Sheet Stock (Container Grade) and Cut Shapes
- D5118 Standard Practice for Fabrication of Fiberboard Shipping Boxes
- D5168 Standard Practice for Fabrication and Closure of Triple-Wall Corrugated Fiberboard Containers
- D5639 Standard Practice for Selection of Corrugated Fiberboard Materials and Box Construction Based on Performance Requirements
- D6804 Standard Guide for Hand Hole Design in Corrugated Boxes

== See also ==
- Box compression test
- Box
- Bulk box
- Corrugated box design
- Closed-loop box reuse
- Composition board
- Corrugated plastic
- Edge crush test
- Foamcore (foam board)
- Packaging and labelling
- Paper recycling
- Paperboard
- Paste board
- Posterboard
