= Iboxamycin =

Names
- IUPAC name (4S,5aS,8S,8aR)-N-{(1S,2S)-2-chloro-1-[(2R,3R,4S,5R,6R)-3,4,5-trihydroxy-6-(methylsulfanyl)oxan-2-yl]propyl}-4-(2-methylpropyl)-3,4,5,5a,6,7,8,8a-octahydro-2H-oxepino[2,3-c]pyrrole-8-carboxamide

Identifiers
3D model (JSmol)	Interactive image
ChemSpider	115009671
PubChem CID	156613433
- InChI: InChI=1S/C22H39ClN2O6S/c1-10(2)7-12-5-6-30-19-13(8-12)9-24-15(19)21(29)25-14(11(3)23)20-17(27)16(26)18(28)22(31-20)32-4/h10-20,22,24,26-28H,5-9H2,1-4H3,(H,25,29)/t11-,12-,13-,14+,15-,16-,17+,18+,19+,20+,22+/m0/s1 Key: JPCLUJPDWMBCAA-SUTQZAMLSA-N
- SMILES: C[C@@H]([C@H]([C@@H]1[C@@H]([C@@H]([C@H]([C@H](O1)SC)O)O)O)NC(=O)[C@@H]2[C@H]3[C@@H](C[C@@H](CCO3)CC(C)C)CN2)Cl

Properties
Chemical formula	C_{22}H_{39}ClN_{2}O_{6}S
Molar mass	495.07 g·mol^{−1}

Related compounds
Related compounds	Cresomycin
- Except where otherwise noted, data are given for materials in their standard state (at 25 °C [77 °F], 100 kPa). Infobox references

Iboxamycin is a synthetic lincosamide or oxepanoprolinamide antibiotic. It binds to the bacterial ribosome in both Gram-negative and Gram-positive bacteria and it has been found to effective against bacteria which are resistant to other antibiotics that target the large ribosomal subunit. It was developed by combining an oxepanoproline unit with the aminooctose residue of clindamycin.

Iboxamycin is effective against ESKAPE bacteria, methicillin-resistant Staphylococcus aureus (MRSA), Enterococcus, Clostridioides difficile, and Listeria monocytogenes, indicating an extended spectrum when compared to clindamycin. Isotopic labeling of iboxamycin with tritium indicated that it binds 70 times more tightly to the ribosome than clindamycin.

Iboxamycin can be administered orally and is safe when administered to mice. It is a bacteriostatic antibiotic.

== See also ==
- Cresomycin - a similar antibiotic developed from iboxamycin
