= Oxepanoprolinamide =

Class of chemical compounds

Chemical structure of iboxamycin

Oxepanoprolinamides are a class of antibiotics. They include iboxamycin. These drugs are fully synthetic. The molecules contain the aminooctose component of clindamycin. They were developed by Andrew G. Myers and Yury S. Polikanov. The structure contains an oxepane (a seven-membered ring compound with oxygen) and a proline, with an amide group that increases rigidity.

Oxepanoprolinamides function by insertion into bacterial ribosomes. They overcome a type of antibiotic resistance to clindamycin based on Erm and Cfr ribosomal RNA methyltransferase enzymes.
