= Cresomycin =

Chemical compound

Identifiers
- IUPAC name: (4S,5aS,8S,8aR)-4-Isobutyl-N-[(1R,7R,8R,9R,10R,11S,12R,Z)-10,11,12-trihydroxy-7-methyl-13-oxa-2-thiabicyclo[7.3.1]tridec-5-en-8-yl]octahydro-2H-oxepino[2,3-c]pyrrol-8-carboxamide
- CAS Number: 2999743-53-0
- PubChem CID: 169247206
- PDB ligand: WC9 (PDBe, RCSB PDB)

Chemical and physical data
- Formula: C_{25}H_{42}N_{2}O_{6}S
- Molar mass: 498.68 g·mol^{−1}
- 3D model (JSmol): Interactive image
- SMILES: CC(C)C[C@@H]1CCO[C@@H]2[C@H](CN[C@@H]2C(=O)N[C@@H]3[C@H](C)\C=C/CCS[C@H]4O[C@H]3[C@H](O)[C@H](O)[C@H]4O)C1
- InChI: InChI=1S/C25H42N2O6S/c1-13(2)10-15-7-8-32-22-16(11-15)12-26-18(22)24(31)27-17-14(3)6-4-5-9-34-25-21(30)19(28)20(29)23(17)33-25/h4,6,13-23,25-26,28-30H,5,7-12H2,1-3H3,(H,27,31)/b6-4-/t14-,15+,16+,17-,18+,19+,20-,21-,22-,23-,25-/m1/s1; Key:GMONVEGLHZWYNO-JBYNEVPESA-N

Cresomycin is an experimental antibiotic. It binds to the bacterial ribosome in both Gram-negative and Gram-positive bacteria, and it has been found to be effective against multi-drug-resistant stains of Staphylococcus aureus, Escherichia coli, and Pseudomonas aeruginosa. It belongs to the bridged macrobicyclic oxepanoprolinamide antibiotics, which have similarities with lincosamides antibiotics.

Cresomycin has been specially designed to bind in a preorganised way with the bacterial ribosome, resulting to improved binding. This allows cresomycin to overcome the ribosomal methylase genes that are responsible for the bacterial resistance against other antibiotics that bind to the peptidyl transferase center of the ribosome, such as lincosamides. Cresomycin was synthesized based on iboxamycin, another oxepanoprolinamide antibiotic, with the addition of a 10-membered ring to it.

Cresomycin has been found to effective against bacteria that are resistant to multiple antibiotics, including lincosamides, both in vitro and in vivo, being more potent than iboxamycin. The antibiotic was found in time-kill studies to be bacteriostatic against S. aureus. In vitro safety experiments with human cells indicated low cytotoxicity.

Cresomycin was developed by a research group led by Andrew G. Myers at the Harvard University Department of Chemistry and Chemical Biology and the University of Illinois at Chicago and received a fund from CARB-X for further development.
