= VFTS 243 =

Spectroscopic binary in the constellation Dorado

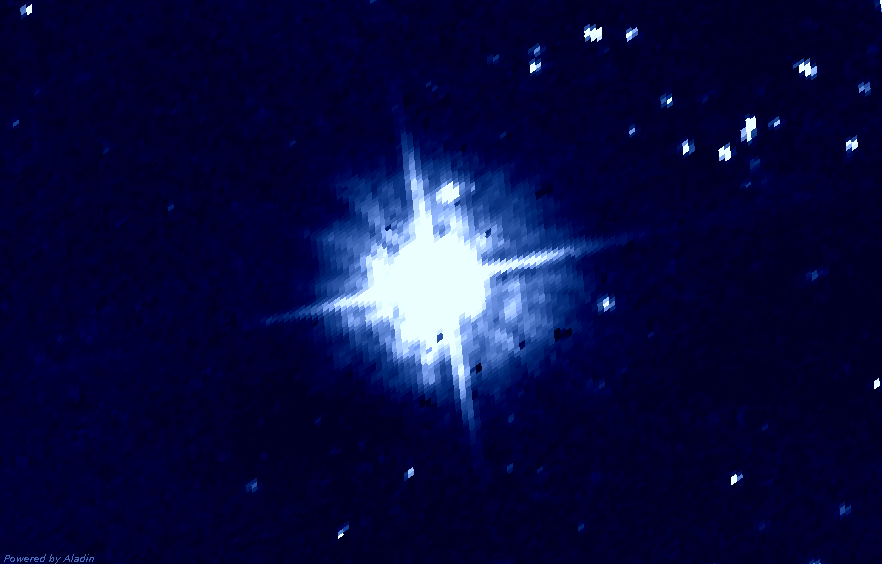
- VFTS 243 in Hubble Space Telescope colours

Observation data Epoch J2000.0 Equinox ICRS
- Constellation: Dorado
- Right ascension: 05^{h} 38^{m} 08.407^{s}
- Declination: −69° 09′ 18.98″
- Apparent magnitude (V): 15.26

Characteristics
- Evolutionary stage: main sequence + black hole
- Spectral type: O7V(n)((f))
- Variable type: variable

Astrometry
Proper motion (μ)	RA: +1.722 mas/yr Dec.: +0.603 mas/yr
Parallax (π)	−0.0468±0.0244 mas

Orbit
Period (P)	10.4031 days
Eccentricity (e)	0.017
Inclination (i)	≥ 40°
Semi-amplitude (K_{1}) (primary)	81.4 km/s

Details

star
Mass	25 ± 2.3 M_{☉}
Radius	10.3 ± 0.3 R_{☉}
Luminosity	158000+14000 −15000 L_{☉}
Surface gravity (log g)	3.7 ± 0.1 cgs
Temperature	36,000 ± 1000 K
Rotational velocity (v sin i)	181 ± 16 km/s
Age	7.4 Myr

black hole
Mass	10.1 ± 2.0 M_{☉}

Other designations
- TIC 277299822, 2MASS J05380840-6909190

Database references
SIMBAD	data

VFTS 243 (2MASS J05380840-6909190) is an O7V type main sequence star that orbits a stellar mass black hole. The black hole is around nine times the mass of the Sun, with the blue star being 25 times the mass of the Sun making the star 200,000 times larger than the black hole. VFTS 243 is located in the Large Magellanic Cloud inside NGC 2070 (the Tarantula Nebula) around 160,000 light years from Earth. The binary has an orbital period of 10.4 days.

== Physical properties ==
VTFS 253 is composed of a rapidly rotating O-type main sequence star and a black hole orbiting each other in a tight, circular orbit every 10.4 days. The system is the only known OB star-black hole binary outside the Milky Way that is 'quiet' in X-ray, with quiet referring to a lack of emissions.

The primary star is roughly 25 solar mass and 10 solar radii. It has filled to roughly a third of its roche lobe is slightly ellipsoidal. It is rapidly rotating with a projected rotational velocity of 181 km/s, implying it had been spun up by accreting matter from the progenitor of the black hole.

The black hole is roughly 10 solar mass and is quiet in X-ray, implying it is not accreting matter from an accretion disk.

=== Evolution ===
Models suggests the system initially formed as a tight massive binary with an orbital period close to 4 days with two stars roughly 30 and 20 solar masses respectively. As the initially more massive star evolved and expanded, it transferred its outer envelope to the secondary star, rejuvenating it in the process. The primary eventually evolved into a Wolf-Rayet star before collapsing into a black hole. Based on the low eccentricity of the orbits, less than 0.5 solar mass was lost during the collapse of the progenitor into the black hole.

Based on evolutionary models, as the now O-type star evolves, it would begin transferring mass back to the less massive black hole, shrinking their orbit in the process. The system is likely to end as a pair of black holes orbiting each other every few days, and would eventually merge to form a single black hole after several tens or hundreds of billions of years.

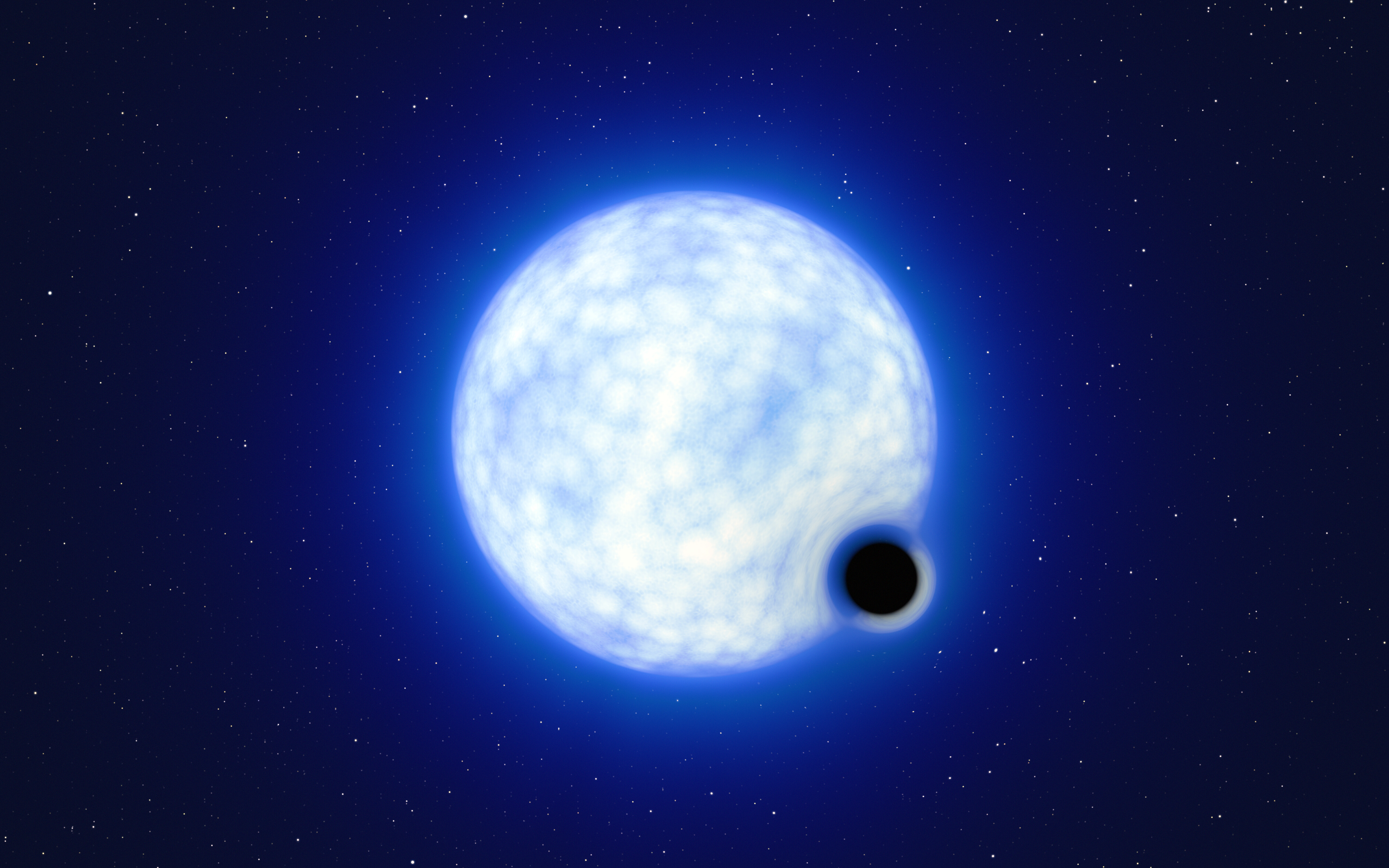
Artist's impression of VFTS 243
