= Mini-Hollands =

City government development programme

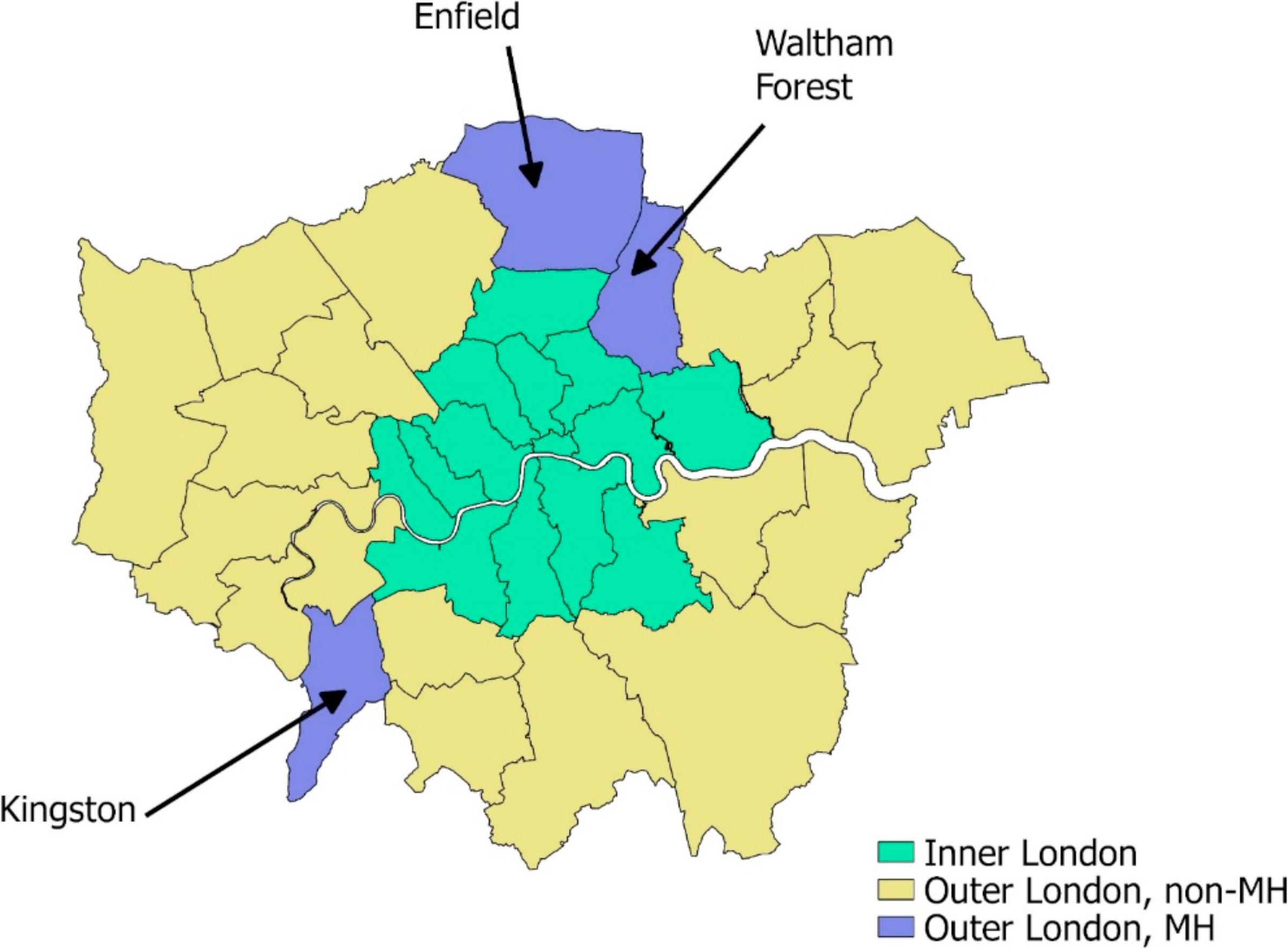
Map showing Mini-Holland boroughs

The Mini-Hollands scheme was introduced in March 2014 by Boris Johnson, then Mayor of London. It took the form of a competition among outer London boroughs for a £100-million fund. Three boroughs – Waltham Forest, Enfield and Kingston – won £30 million each, and the remaining £10 million was shared by several other boroughs.

The scheme supported the boroughs to build Dutch-style cycling infrastructure such as traffic calming, segregated bike lanes, safety measures at junctions and blocking residential streets to car traffic. It aimed to encourage modal shift from car to bike for short journeys.

== Borough plans ==
=== Enfield ===
- separate bus and cycle lanes and the prohibition of through traffic in Church Street
- A Dutch-style roundabout with segregated cycle lanes at Edmonton Green
- lightly segregated cycle lanes along the A1010, A105 and A110
- a network of Quietways and Greenways across the borough
- cycle hubs providing bike parking at Enfield Town and Edmonton Green railway stations

=== Kingston ===
- a cycle hub at Kingston railway station and upgrading of the station square
- a cycle bridge from the station to the Thames riverfront
- the Go Cycle cycle path network

=== Waltham Forest ===
- traffic calming in Walthamstow Village, Leyton and Leytonstone, including several dozen blended 'Copenhagen' crossings, with continuous footways across side streets
- 22 kilometres of segregated cycle lanes, including 4 kilometres of Lea Bridge Road

As a result, Waltham Forest won the 2017 London Transport Award for 'Transport Borough of the Year'.

== Evaluation ==
In June 2018 the Guardian reported on a study by Westminster University which interviewed 1,712 people in the three boroughs. The study found that after one year:

- While cycling increased by an average of 9 minutes a week, walking increased by 32 minutes a week;
- there was no evidence that the mini-Hollands benefited cycling at the expense of other modes: for example that time spent in cars was increasing due to congestion, or that walking was becoming less attractive;
- There was no significant reduction in overall car use;
- public attitudes to cycling became more positive, across demographic and socioeconomic groups.

Research published in the March 2021 edition of the Journal of Transport & Health measured the programme's impact on local residents. Among these are:

- health economic benefit of £724m from interventions costing £80m
- increased likelihood of meeting active travel and physical activity targets

== Negative Criticism ==
In February 2018, CityMetric criticised the slow roll-out of the programme and reported flaws in public consultation and opposition from some residents.
