= Rings of Earth =

Hypothetical planetary rings around Earth

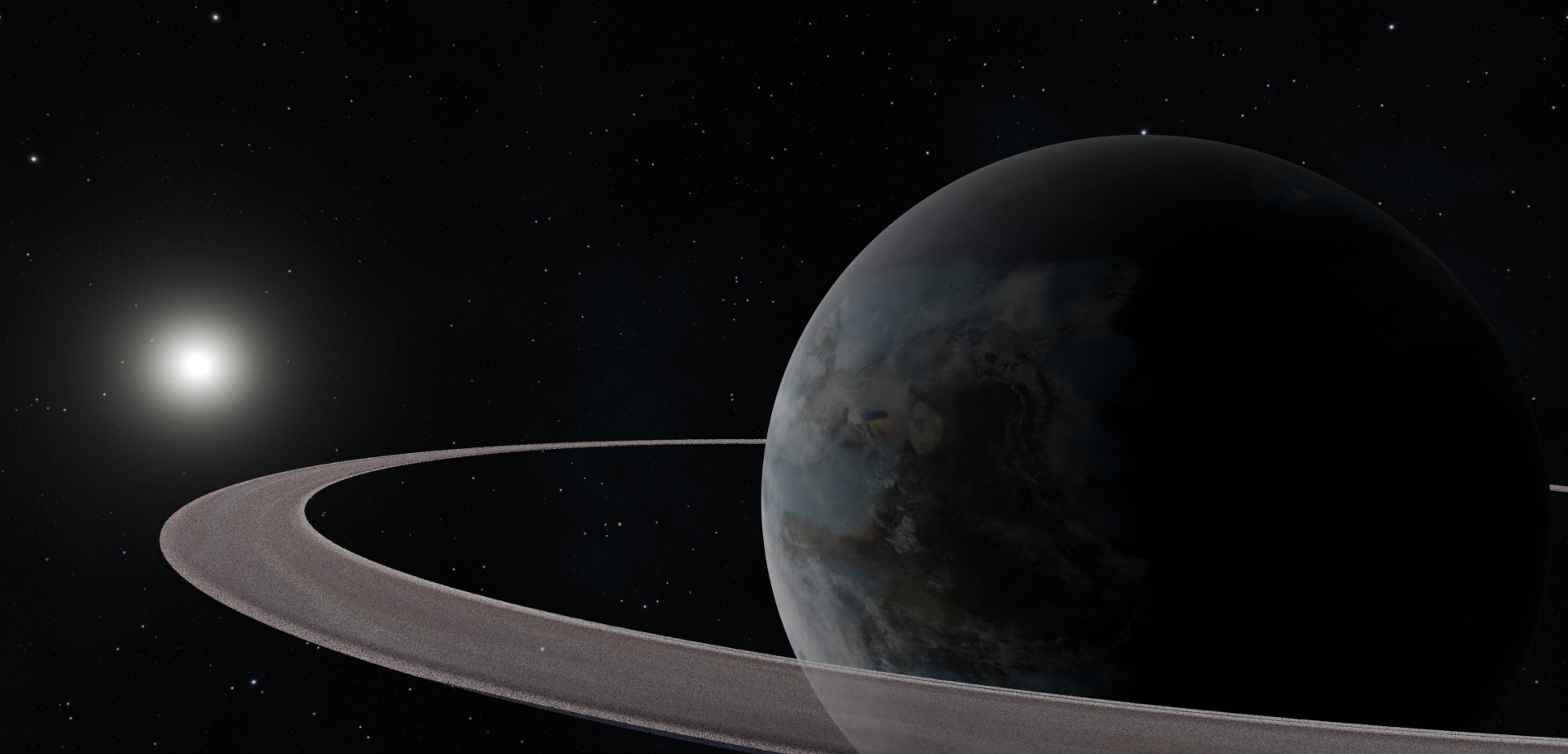
A view of Earth during the Late Ordovician (Katian) with a hypothetical set of rings. The large landmass is the paleocontinent Laurentia.

The rings of Earth are a hypothetical ring system around Earth that exist or existed in the past, although none have yet been confidently confirmed to have existed. The region in space occupied by artificial satellites and other objects in geostationary orbit is sometimes referred to as the geostationary ring.

== Effects ==
A planetary ring blocks incoming sunlight from reaching the atmosphere and surface, casting a shadow on the planet whose position and extent depend on the nature of the ring and time of year, which could significantly alter the Earth's climate.

A 2002 research paper studied the effects of a dense equatorial debris ring on the climate of modern Earth. It assumed a completely opaque ring extending from 9,758 to 12,310 km, rescaled from Saturn's B ring. It found that the global average temperature decreased, partially enhanced by positive feedback from increased sea ice and snow cover, with tropical and subtropical regions shaded by the rings experiencing particularly severe cooling. The cooling of the tropics reduced the equator to a polar temperature gradient, which in turn reduced the strength of tropospheric winds globally. Precipitation decreases were noted in most regions, except in subtropical monsoon regions, where rainfall increased. Some of these changes may be reflected in geological records, such as shifts in vegetation due to altered temperatures and rainfall, or reduced atmospheric dust transport and reduction in dust sizes resulting from weakened tropospheric winds.

In a modern setting, ring particles would endanger low Earth orbit satellites, and reflected light from the ring would be much brighter than the full Moon at night.

== Proposed past natural rings ==
=== Neoproterozoic ===
A planetary ring may have initiated a global glaciation event during the Neoproterozoic, possibly triggering snowball Earth conditions, after which the high albedo Earth could remain frozen even after the rings had dissipated. There are also other plausible causes, such as rapid carbon dioxide drawdown.

=== Ordovician ===
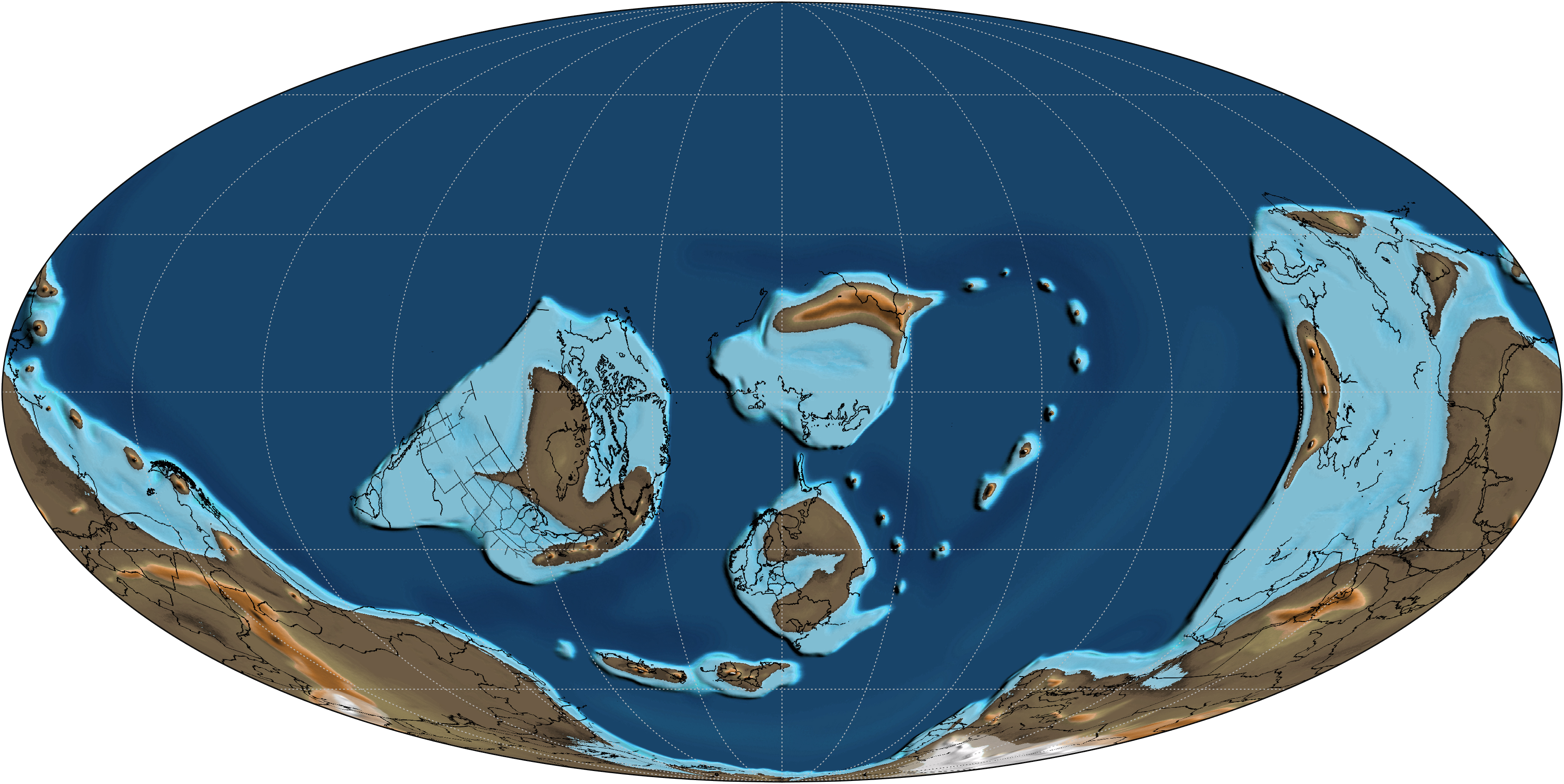
Mollweide paleogeographic map of Earth 465 million years ago, when the rings were proposed to have existed.

In 2024 it was proposed that Earth may have had a set of rings during the Ordovician period, approximately 466 million years ago. The study found 21 impact craters located within 30° of the Earth's equator at the time, despite the fact that ~70% of the Earth's crust suitable for the preservation of craters is located outside this band. It noted that the chances of all 21 craters falling within the 30° range was one in 25 million, which was interpreted as highly unlikely unless the craters were caused by a decaying ring system.

The rings would have been created by an L chondrite parent body which passed near Earth within the Roche limit, causing it to break up and form a debris ring. The rings would gradually decay with time, with fragments falling to earth resulting in the formation of the craters. The enhanced rate of meteorite impacts on Earth during this time was previously proposed to be caused by a break up of a large parent body that was 150 km in diameter.

The rings may have existed for up to 40 million years. The paper further speculated that the Hirnantian glaciation may be a direct result of the rings shading the Earth. Although a review on the Ordovician cooling conducted in 2025 noted that the temperature trend is gradual, while the ring system was expected to produce an abrupt cooling effect.

=== Late Eocene ===
Impact events which occurred during the late Eocene, around 36 million years ago, may have produced a transient debris ring which cooled the Earth over its lifetime of around a hundred thousand to a million years, providing a possible explanation for the prolonged cooling event previously identified to occur during this period. Despite this, a 2024 study failed to identify climatic responses to the late Eocene impacts.

An earlier proposal theorized that a tektite debris ring related to the late Eocene impact events could be responsible for the Eocene–Oligocene extinction event. However, the Eocene-Oligocene boundary occurred about 2 million years after the impact events, and the cooling took place over several million years, consistent with a long-term climate change rather than the abrupt and clearly contemporaneous effect that a ring would have.

== See also ==
- Rings of Rhea, a set of theorized rings around Rhea
