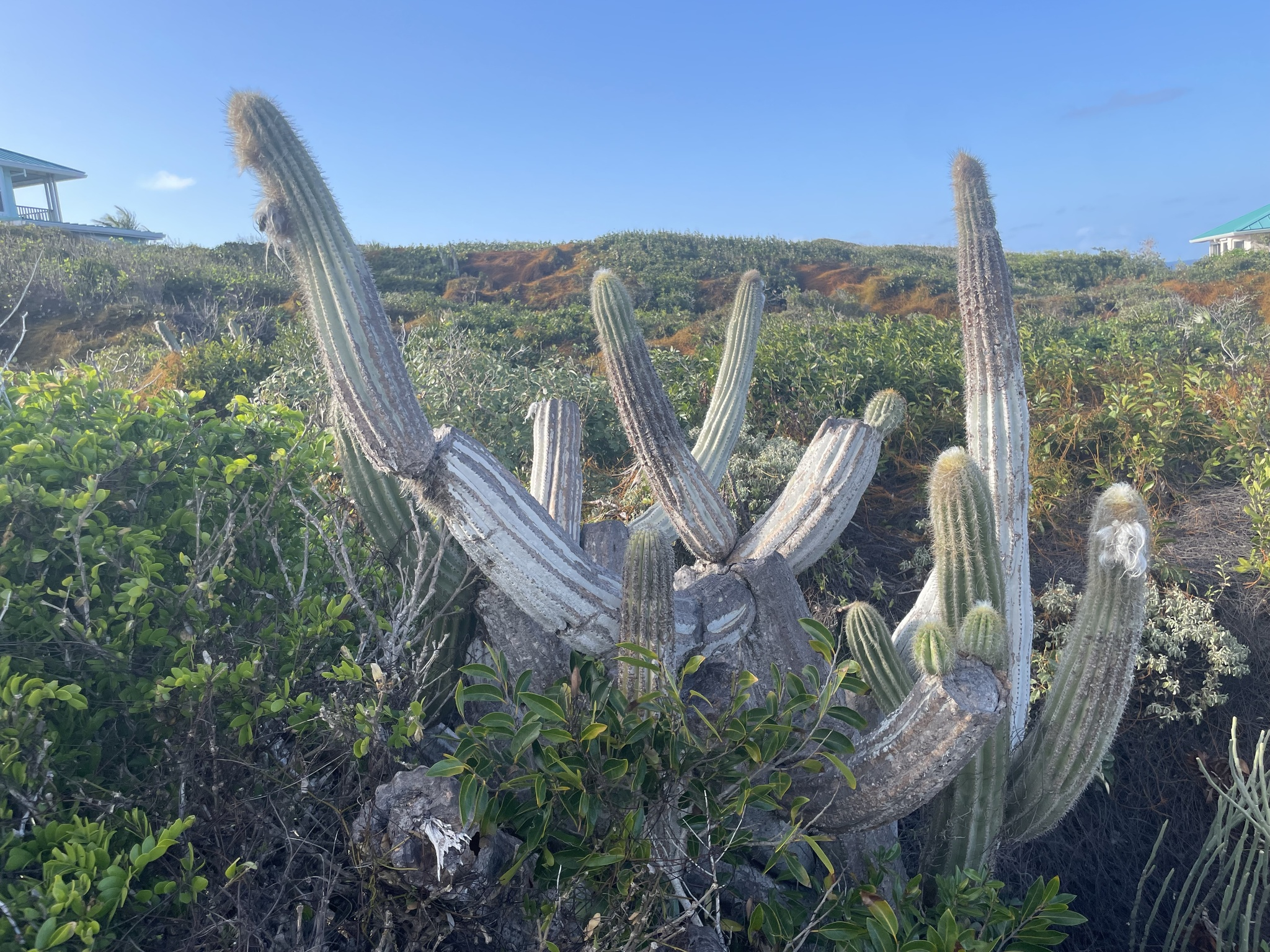

Scientific classification
- Kingdom: Plantae
- Clade: Tracheophytes
- Clade: Angiosperms
- Clade: Eudicots
- Order: Caryophyllales
- Family: Cactaceae
- Subfamily: Cactoideae
- Genus: Pilosocereus
- Species: P. millspaughii

Binomial name
- Pilosocereus millspaughii (Britton) Byles & G.D.Rowley

Synonyms
- Cephalocereus millspaughii Britton; Cereus millspaughii (Britton) Vaupel; Pilocereus millspaughii (Britton) F.M.Knuth; Pilosocereus robinii subsp. millspaughii (Britton) Guiggi

= Pilosocereus millspaughii =

Species of cactus

Pilosocereus millspaughii, commonly called the Key Largo tree cactus, is a species of flowering plant in the family Cactaceae, native to The Bahamas, Cuba, Haiti, and the Turks and Caicos Islands. It was also native to Florida, but is now locally extinct there due to sea level rise. It was first described by Nathaniel Lord Britton in 1909 as Cephalocereus millspaughii.

== Description ==
Pilosocereus millspaughii is a shrubby to arborescent, branched succulent which can reach heights of up to 7 m (23 ft). The main stem is 20 cm (8 in) wide, and the branches are 15 cm (6 in) wide. The stems are grayish green with 8–13 ribs. The areoles have spines up to 7 cm (2.8 in) long that are yellow to brown when young. Flowering areoles have silky hairs up to 7 cm (2.8 in) long. These hairs are sparse or absent on non-flowering areoles. The flowers are 5–7 cm (2.0–2.8 in) long, with reddish green outer segments (tepals) and white inner segments. The fragrant flowers smell like garlic. The fruit is red.

== Taxonomy ==
Pilosocereus millspaughii was first described by Britton in 1909 as Cephalocereus millspaughii. The epithet millspaughii is presumed to commemorate Charles Frederick Millspaugh, a botanical curator of the Field Museum of Natural History in Chicago. The species was originally described from the southeast of The Bahamas, and was distinguished by its very long silky hairs. Identification of plants found elsewhere, including Hispaniola, Haiti and Cuba, as the same species was considered "tentative" in a 2019 study, with further studies being required.

Some authors have treated P. millspaughii and P. robinii as one species. When considered distinct, the presence of silky hairs in the former and their absence in the latter is considered to be the main characteristic that separates them. Others have accepted that P. millspaughii is a recognizable taxon, but considered it not sufficiently different from P. robinii to justify treating it as a distinct species, and hence accepted as a subspecies, P. robinii subsp. millspaughii.

== Distribution ==
As of June 2025, Pilosocereus millspaughii is considered to be native to The Bahamas, Cuba, Haiti, and the Turks and Caicos Islands and to be extinct in Florida, although its identification outside The Bahamas has been considered "tentative".
