= Toddler nutrition =

Toddler nutrition is the description of the dietary needs of toddlers aged one to two years old. Food provides the energy and nutrients that toddlers need to be healthy. An adequate intake in nutrient rich food is good nutrition. A diet lacking essential calories, minerals, fluid and vitamins could be considered 'bad' nutrition. Nutrition needs are different for toddlers. For a baby, breast milk is "best" and it has all the necessary vitamins and minerals. Toddlers typically have been weaned from breast milk and infant formula. Though infants usually start eating solid foods between 4 and 6 months of age, more and more solid foods are consumed by a growing toddler. If a food introduced one at a time, a potential allergen can be identified. Food provides the energy and nutrients that young children need to be healthy. Toddlers are learning to feed themselves and to eat new foods. They should eat a variety of foods from all the food groups. Each day, toddlers need enough nutrients, including

- 7 milligrams of iron
- 700 milligrams of calcium
- 600 IU of vitamin D

The eating habits of toddlers differ from those of infants in that their diet resembles that of parents and siblings. Good nutrition for toddlers is the introduction of foods with new textures and flavors. A toddler will show preference for one food over another. The stomach of toddlers are small. Good nutrition and food will be to offer foods that are nutrient rich rather than foods with empty calories. Toddlers play with their food and practice self-feeding. They will use their fingers at first then common eating utensils. Toddlers benefit from becoming more independent in feeding themselves. A toddler may try to assert control over mealtimes and can cause conflict. Toddlers eat in response to feelings of hunger and of being full.

== USDA guidelines and menu choices ==
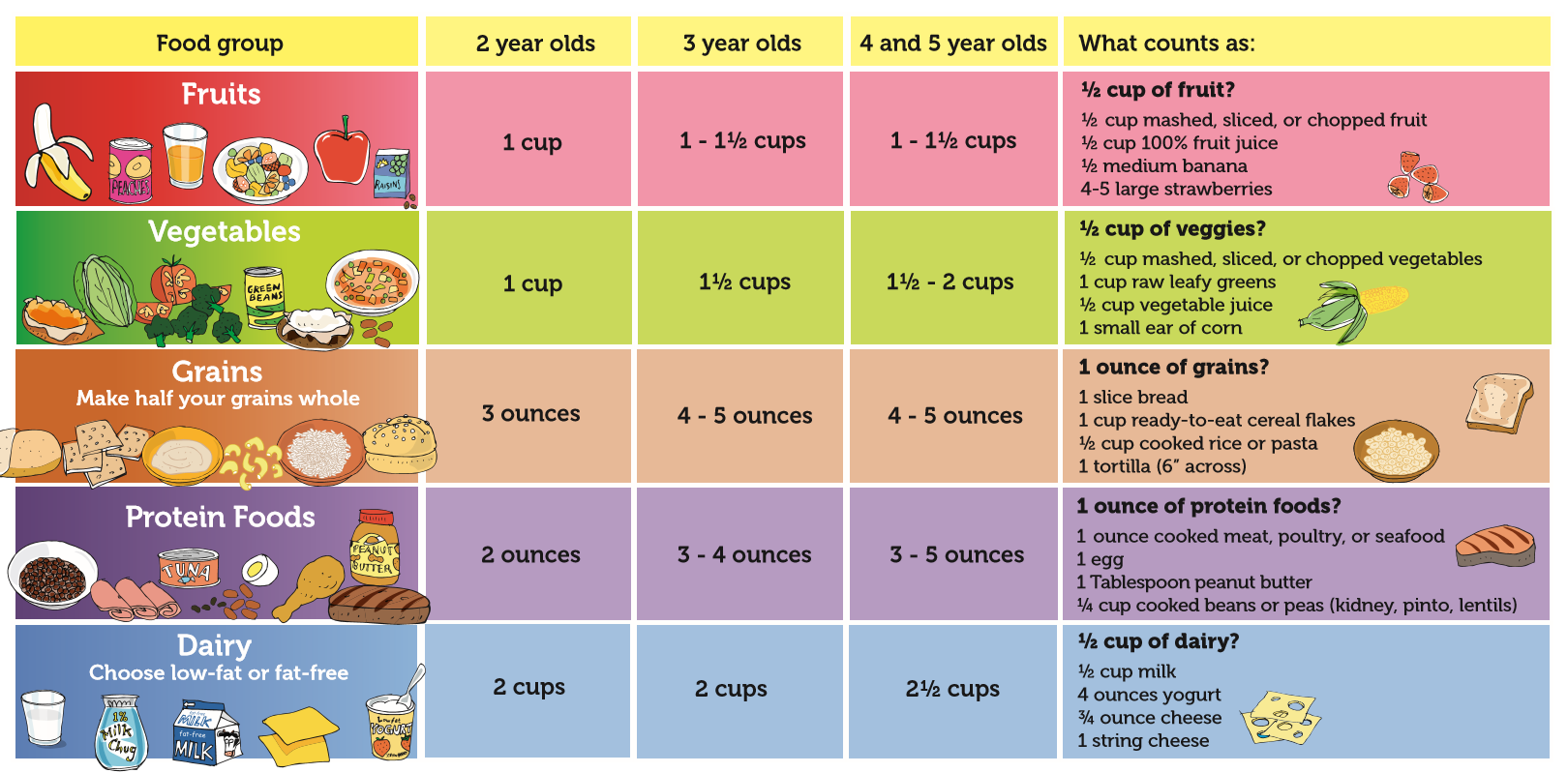
US Department of Agriculture Nutrition Guidelines

== Milk ==
Milk contains calcium and vitamin D. These substances are essential for proper bone and teeth formation. Typically, toddlers will benefit the most from drinking whole milk (3.25% milk fat) as the dietary fats needed for proper growth and development of the brain are found in highest abundance in whole milk. Even toddlers can be overweight. A family history of heart disease, high cholesterol, or obesity, may require using reduced fat (2%) milk. At age 2 a toddler can move from whole milk to low-fat or nonfat milk if they prefer.

With respect to method of consumption, a toddler should typically transition from either breast feeding or bottle feeding to drinking from a cup at about the first birthday. If the toddler is breastfed they can transition directly to a cup and bypass ever using a bottle. They benefit most from a gradual transition by weaning, rather than abruptly withholding bottles. One strategy is to offer a cup of whole milk sometime after the meal begins. Toddlers often don't prefer cow's milk over breast milk or infant formula, so cow’s milk can be introduced to the toddler through gradual mixing with breast milk or infant formula with the result of the toddler receiving all cow's milk. Milk intake for toddlers can be reduced when protein from other sources is added to the diet. Paediatricians can offer advice if caregivers believe that the toddler may be drinking too much milk.

Toddler milk is a high-cost, under-regulated drink made of powdered milk, added sugars, vegetable oil, and salt that is not recommended by the American Academy of Pediatrics.

== Iron ==
Iron deficiency can be a concern when the toddler reaches one year of age. Iron deficiency can cause problems in normal growth and development, and health issues such as anemia. Iron can be given to toddler in meat, fish, beans, and other iron-fortified foods. Toddlers benefit from eating iron-fortified cereal up until the age of 18 to 24 months.

== Fruit Juice ==
Toddler fruit juice intake is often improperly regulated by parents due to its perceived health benefits and content packaging that allows for easy transport. Over-consumption of fruit juice products can actually negatively impact toddler health and is strongly associated with diseases such as diarrhea, malnutrition and tooth decay. Paediatricians, dentists and other healthcare providers should educate parents as to the risks associated with overconsumption of fruit juices. Similarly, unpasteurized juice products can contain pathogens that can cause serious illness in toddlers and should be completely avoided. Importantly, drinking fruit drinks, which often contain very little fruit content and high levels of added sugars, does not replace proper intake of fruits as they don't provide the same fibre and nutrient content. However, consumption of 100% fruit juice (no added sugars or other ingredients) may offer more nutritional benefits than juice drinks, and can be considered to be a part of a healthy balanced diet when limited to 8 fluid-ounces (250 mL) per day.

== Foods to avoid ==
Food allergies can develop, or become evident, in toddlers. The risk of the child developing food allergies is greater if close family members have allergies. As toddlers transition from a primarily milk-based diet to a diet that includes soft and solid foods, they will encounter a variety of new foods. As each new food is introduced, careful observation is required in order to determine if an allergy exists, or is developing.

== Choking ==
Many foods pose a high risk of choking for toddlers, such as: nuts, raisins, hot dogs and popcorn. Toddlers should never be unsupervised while eating foods that can cause choking and every effort should be made to cut solid foods into small pieces.

== Mealtimes ==
Toddlers can be given three meals per day. A schedule of snacks 2-3 times each day is appropriate. Toddlers sometimes will not want to eat at mealtime. Skipping a meal will not harm the toddler. Pushing food onto a child who is not hungry can lead to feeding problems - neither is eating on demand.

Toddlers benefit from knowing that meals and snacks will be offered on a regular schedule. Concerns about adequate nutrition and calorie intake can be discussed with the pediatrician.
