= Vegetarian and vegan dog diet =

Plant-based dog food

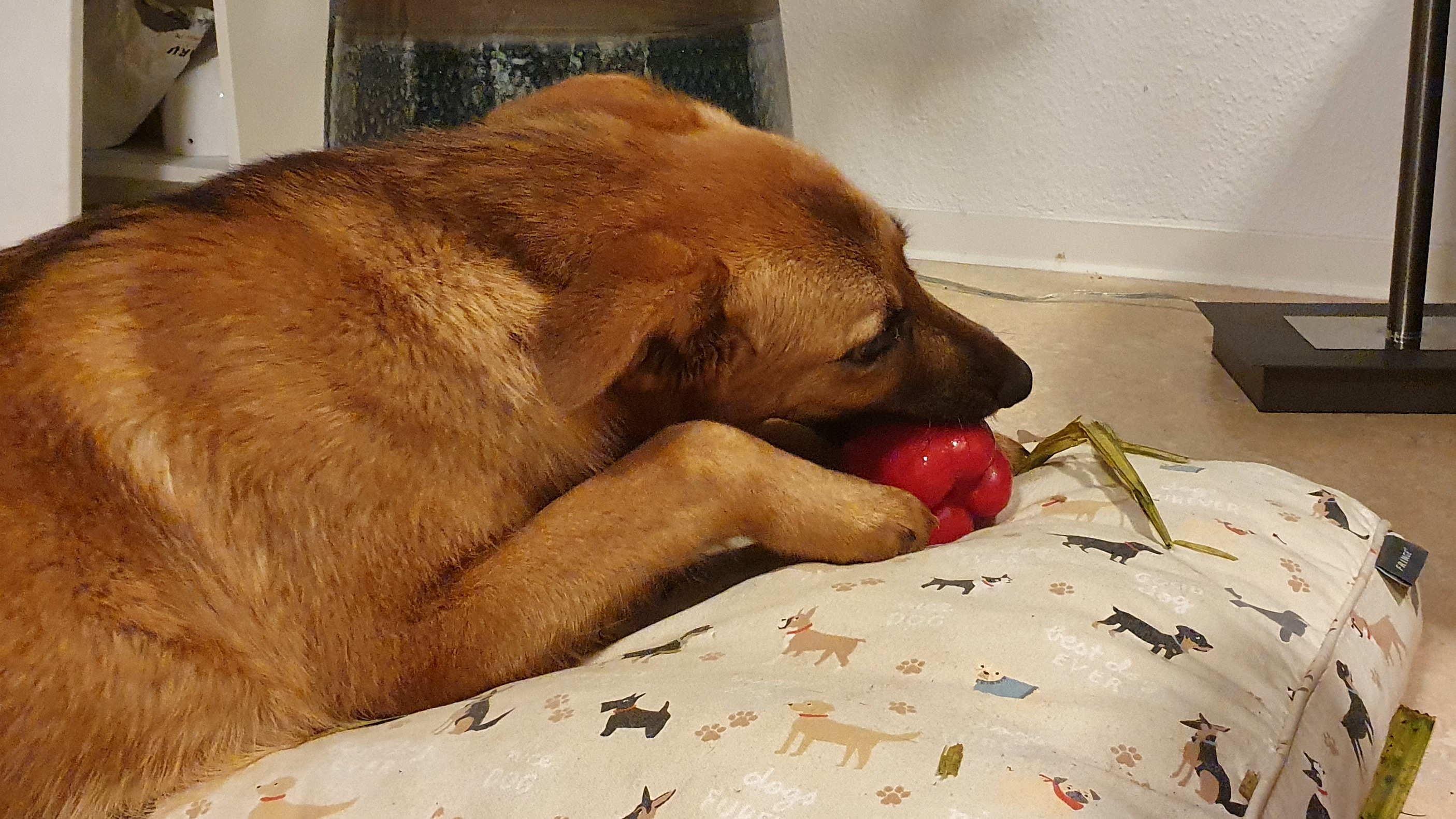
A mutt eating a bell pepper

As in the human practice of veganism, vegan dog foods are those formulated with the exclusion of ingredients that contain or were processed with any part of an animal, or any animal byproduct. Vegan dog food may incorporate the use of fruits, vegetables, cereals, legumes including soya, nuts, vegetable oils, as well as any other non-animal based foods.

The omnivorous domestic dog was originally primarily a carnivore but has evolved to metabolize carbohydrates, fat, and fiber and remain healthy on a diet lower in protein. A systematic review of studies from 2023 found no evidence of detrimental effects of vegetarian diets for dogs; however, the authors pointed out studies tended to have a small sample size, or use owner-reported metrics, which can be subject to selection bias.

In theory a vegan diet is also nutritionally adequate for dogs if properly formulated and balanced. The American Kennel Club highlights risks factors of a vegan diet such as ensuring adequate protein intake, imbalance of certain amino acids, such as taurine and L-carnitine and potential vitamin or mineral deficiency. To offset these risks, supplements may need to be added to the dog's vegan or vegetarian diet, most importantly those that provide taurine, L-carnitine and vitamin B-12. According to this advice, dogs in the wild prefer animal-based protein, so matching their diet more closely to what they would eat if getting food on their own is more reliable for ensuring health. This dietary advice for dogs resembles that for humans on balanced vegan diets, where it is also important to ensure inclusion of essential nutrients, such as calcium, iron, iodine, selenium, vitamin B12 and vitamin D, possibly in the form of supplements, especially in pregnancy and early life stages.

Motivations for vegans diets include animal welfare and environmental impacts of animal agriculture. As of 2018, there are around 470 million pet dogs.

== History of plant-based dog diets ==
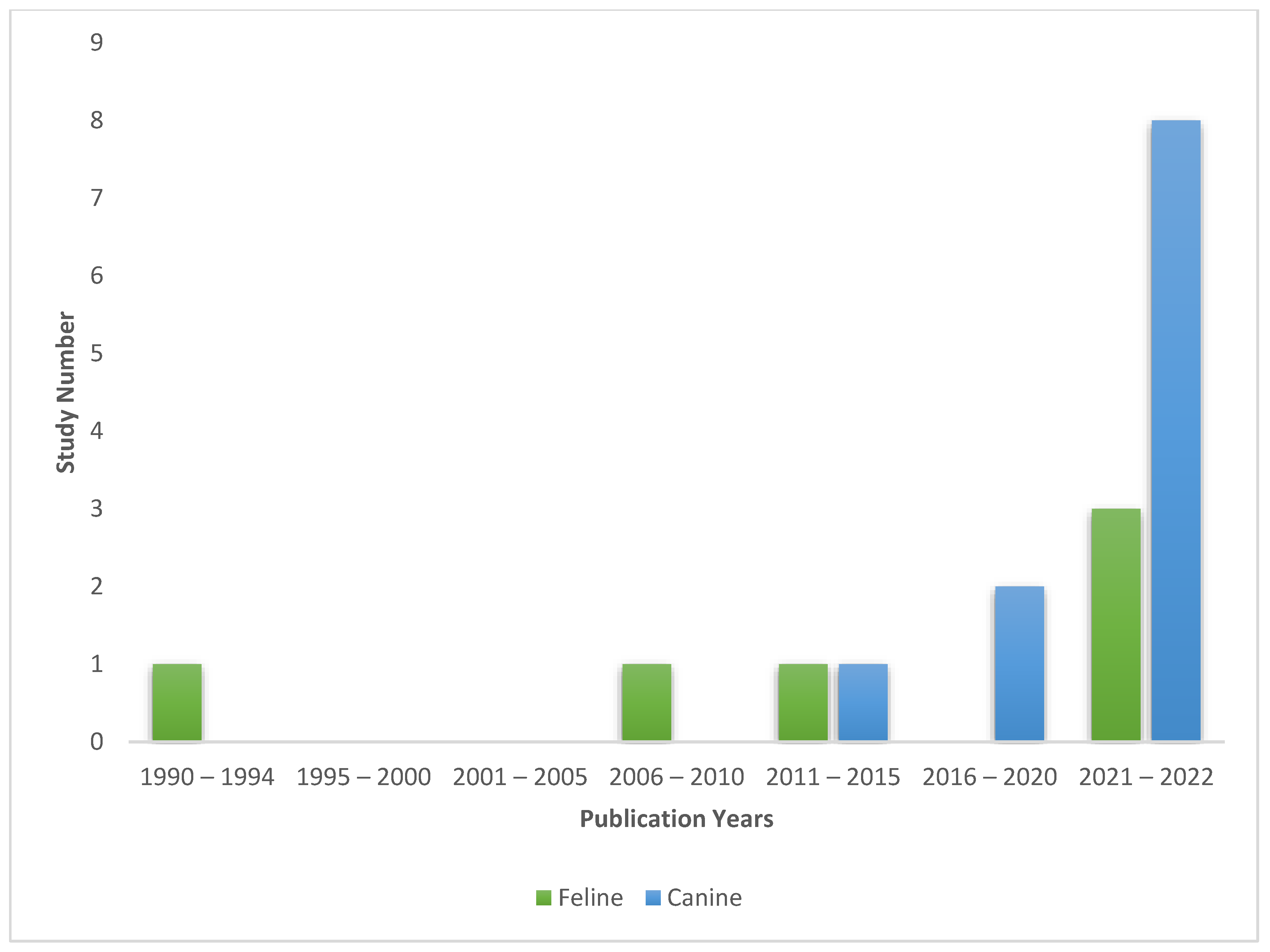
Number and years of publication of studies involving dogs and cats fed vegan diets

Plant based dog diets may have been around as early as the Bronze Age. An isotope analysis on a site in the Iberian Peninsula found that one group of dogs had a significant proportion of cereals in their diet. Their isotope patterns scarcely differed from the domestic herbivores pointing to a similar intake of plant protein, though small amounts of animal protein cannot be ruled out this way.

In 1980, the UK's first commercially marketed vegetarian dog food became available.

There are many published vegetarian feeding-regimens available to follow. As the popularity of this diet has grown with a corresponding increase in people practicing vegetarianism, there are various commercial vegetarian and vegan diets available on the market, where both terms are often used interchangeably.

In 2024, a comprehensive feeding trial on one vegan dog diet was successfully completed.

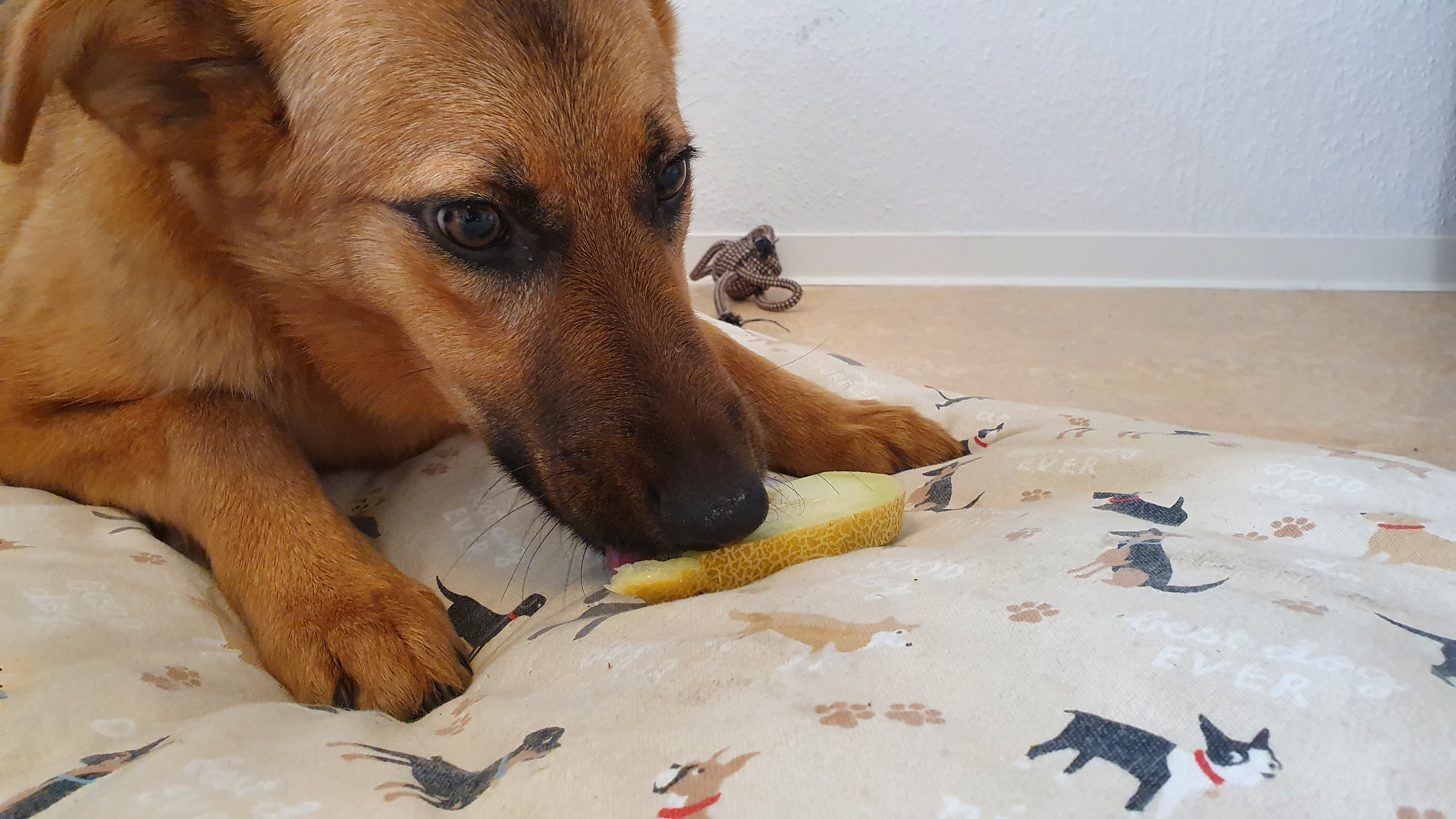
A puppy eating a canary melon

== Dietary needs of the dog ==
Dogs will not seek out specific foods to meet nutritional deficiencies and will continue to consume a nutritionally inadequate diet.

The dietary requirements of dogs differ based on a variety of aspects (i.e. age, level of activity, living environment, etc.). Rather than specific ingredients, diets are formulated for their specific nutrients, so every diet prepared must have adequate levels of nutrients, including: protein, fats, carbohydrates, amino acids (methionine, lysine, arginine, etc.), vitamins (B vitamins, vitamin A, etc.), and minerals (calcium, phosphorus, sodium, etc.).

Since dogs are omnivores, they can digest both animal and some plant based matter. A vegetarian diet choice was adapted to canines because of the ethical preferences of people who practice vegetarianism, as well as for pet owners seeking an alternative diet for pets suffering from food allergies, specifically animal-protein allergies.

== Potential risks ==
Vegetarian and vegan dog diets may carry some risks, especially when these are homemade.

=== Alkaline urine ===
High urinary pH is associated with developing struvite crystals, dysuria, hematuria and obstructing the urinary tract of dogs. Breakdown of amino acids has an effect on the acidity of the urine. Plant based diets typically contain fewer of the acidifying amino acids than meat based ones. Studies confirm dogs on plant-based diets have higher pH (i.e. decreased acidity) of their urine. However, it is unclear if this exceeds normal ranges and leads to detrimental clinical outcomes with the limited research available.

With potential increased risk of high pH urine, regular monitoring of a plant-based dogs' urine may provide benefits. When detected early, high urinary pH can be treated by adding more acidifying ingredients or supplements to the diet.

=== Guidelines ===
A 2020 study evaluated vegan pet foods in the Brazilian market and found nutritional inadequacies when compared to FEDIAF and AAFCO recommendations.

Conversely, a 2019 study analyzing 177 commercial conventional pet foods sold in the UK discovered that most did not meet European guidelines on mineral content, indicating that nutritional deficiencies are not exclusive to plant-based diets.

=== Homemade diets ===
==== Inappropriate nutrient profile ====
There are many vegetarian and vegan recipes available but due to the extra attention creating a complete and balanced plant-based diet requires, many of these are insufficient in macrominerals such as protein, and microminerals that include vitamin D and vitamin B_{12}. These deficiencies cannot be corrected by including specific whole food ingredients due to the volume they would have to eat to meet requirements, thus nutritional supplements are necessary. Supplements contain anywhere from 0–300% of the vitamins and/or mineral amount required daily when the suggested dose is followed. Some ingredient inclusions can also be detrimental to a canine's overall health. Onion and garlic are often included in homemade recipes regardless of their association with hemolytic anemia in dogs. Current recommendations are that all formulations and supplementation of alternative dog diets are made by a veterinary nutritionist.

==== Deviation from recipe instructions ====
Obtaining precision and accuracy when following a recipe for plant-based diets is essential. Ingredient substitutions made over time due to affordability, availability, and owner and pet preferences, increase the risk of inadequacy. Each ingredient has a specific purpose of inclusion in a recipe; thus, substitutions may not be appropriate, especially if the diet was created for a medical condition. There are many ingredients that have been associated with disease pathologies in dogs and should not be added to a diet. To name a few, raisins, grapes, and sultanas have been associated with renal failure (see Grape toxicity in dogs). Members of the allium family, including onion, garlic, shallots, and leeks are linked to the development of hemolytic anemia, and chocolate is associated with cardiac abnormalities and pancreatitis. A veterinary nutritionist can make suitable suggestions on altering existing recipes if concerns arise.

==== Inadequate feeding recommendations ====
Feeding instructions for homemade diets often lack clarity. Improper or excluded caloric information and body weight recommendations increase the risk of energy over-consumption leading to obesity. Dogs can also be undernourished and develop deficiency symptoms. Vague feeding guidelines can contribute to poor weight management because ideal body weight values are not communicated to the consumer.

=== Calcium deficiency ===
Commercial vegan diets can result in calcium deficiency, this can result in growth retardation. Skeleton mineralisation accompanied with growth deficiencies result in a decrease of plasma calcium levels and induces hyperparathyroidism, in turn leading to bone resorption.

=== Calcium oxalate urolithiasis ===
High levels of calcium and oxalate in the urine causes urolithiasis. Urinary oxalate is derived from oxalic acid, which is typically occurs only in low volumes in a dog's diet, but vegetables, legumes, and some vegetable-based fibres are high in oxalic acid. Levels of oxalic acid should be below 40–45mg oxalic acid/Mcal or <20 mg oxalic acid/100g of food (dry matter basis). Excessive vitamin C can also cause calcium oxalate urolithiasis.

== Potential benefits ==
A systematic review in 2023 reported potential benefits and found little evidence for adverse effects to dogs on a commercial vegetarian diet. Based on dog guardian perceptions (which increase the risk of bias), the review suggested relatively lower cardiac, skin, and renal issues with vegetarian diets. A further benefit for the guardians was less odor from their animals.

== Environmental impact ==
Like humans, dogs have a significant environmental impact. In the US, cats and dogs are estimated to be responsible for 25-30% of the impacts from animal farming on the environment. 90% of dogs' impact on carbon emissions comes from their food. Switching a dog from a typical diet with meat to one without, reduces those emissions by 37%. The agricultural land freed up if all the world's dogs were fed a vegan diet could feed an additional 450 million people, because animal product require more land than plant-based foods.

On average, switching a dog from a typical to a vegan diet can reduce carbon emissions by 340 kg CO_{2}eq per year.

== Processing ==
Processing is an important determinant of what nutrients a dog is actually able to digest and absorb. Plant-based ingredients can be very difficult to break down without proper enzymes in the animal's digestive tract to do this. Processing has the ability to break down nutrients such as insoluble fiber and protein that can aid in the digestibility of the ingredients and ensure the dog is utilizing the nutrients given to meet its requirements. However, processing can cause negative effects to these traits as well.

=== Nutritional aspects of processing ===
Processing has both beneficial and detrimental effects on feed ingredients as it applies high levels of heat, and with extrusion, pressure with reduction of moisture content.

==== Carbohydrate ====
During the extrusion process, sucrose is converted to reducing sugars that can be lost from Maillard reactions. Therefore, it is often seen that sugar amounts are decreased at this time. Oligosaccharides, such as raffinose and stachyose, impair nutrient utilization of grains. In the extrusion process there is a destruction of oligosaccharides that prevent flatulence and thus improves utilization of legumes used in the feed. Gelatinization of starches is a required step in extruding foods in order to form the desired porous appearance. This step allows enzymes to react with starch and increase starch breakdown.

==== Fiber ====
Processing increases water solubility of fiber by reducing the molecular weight of starch molecules like hemicellulose and pectin. This conversion of insoluble to soluble fiber increases the total dietary soluble fiber amounts in the feed mixture by making fiber more susceptible to absorption.

==== Lipids ====
Levels of 6 to 8% fat used in the extrusion process are not advised, as it limits the product's ability to expand. This is because fat causes poor pressure levels in the barrel due to more traction. If high fat ingredients are used, some free oil may be lost when product goes through the diet. Food processing can increase the nutritional quality of the product by minimizing lipid oxidation.

==== Vitamins ====
Increasing temperatures, pressure, and screw speed from extrusion affects retention of vitamins such as β-carotene, thiamine, ascorbic acid and vitamin A. The lower amounts of moisture and variability in die diameter have been also known to cause this effect. It is recommended to add additional amounts of vitamins into the mixture before processing to counterbalance the loss of vitamins during this process.

==== Minerals ====
Macromolecules are primarily affected during processing compared to molecules of a smaller size. Processing reduces various anti-nutritional factors that would otherwise impair absorption, which in turn improves the overall absorption of minerals.

== Alternative sourcing of ingredients ==
Due to the exclusion of animal products which are an important part of conventional dog food, nutrients provided by them need to be replaced. This requires strategic formulation using plant, mineral and synthetic ingredients, to ensure all nutrients are provided in their absorbable form and sufficient amounts.

=== Protein ===
A good source of protein provides a dog with a balanced and complete profile of amino acids, and is essential for growth, muscle maintenance, and various cellular functions. In a plant-based dog food, the protein composition can be sourced from a variety of ingredients, such grains, rice, corn, wheat, and/or barley. Soybeans are one of the most common plant-based protein sources in dog foods. If soy is excluded, e.g. for hypoallergenic purposes, chickpeas, green peas, rice, potatoes, and Nutritional yeast are also common ingredients for this.

With the right heating process, protein becomes more easily digestible in products that have been processed compared to those that have not. Specifically for vegetable protein, an increase in its nutritional value is seen due to this improved digestibility.

=== Calcium ===
Calcium is a micronutrient that is essential for the proper mineralization of bones, teeth, and intracellular signalling. The amount of calcium required by an animal is related to many other nutrients such as phosphorus intake, as it is important to balance calcium and phosphorus levels at a ratio of 1.2–1.4:1. Protein intake is also a factor, as increased consumption of protein leads to more calcium being excreted in the urine to balance out the nitrogenous waste products of the amino acid metabolism.

For humans, common food sources of calcium can be found in dairy products. However, dairy products are often not used as a conventional dog food ingredient, and therefore, calcium is typically supplemented as calcium carbonate or another compounded form. Although there are many plant ingredients that are high in calcium such as collard greens, soy, and other leafy vegetables, plants are generally high in phosphorus and relatively lower in calcium content. It is thus advised that vegan diets include a mineral source of calcium to ensure healthy functioning, and most commercial vegan formulas supplement calcium in the same manner as conventional dog food.

=== Vitamin D ===
Vitamin D is essential for proper calcium regulation and is important for bone mineralization, nerve function, immunity, and intracellular signalling. Dogs are able to synthesize and convert 7-dehydrocholesterol (provitamin form of vitamin D) to cholecalciferol (inactive form of vitamin D) following exposure to UV light from the sun. Cholecalciferol is then converted to calcidiol in the liver before further hydroxylated to calcitriol, the active form of vitamin D, in the kidney. However, the conversion of provitamin D to cholecalciferol is significantly lower in dogs than other mammals, and is not sufficient to maintain an adequate vitamin D status. Thus, dogs depend on dietary sources of vitamin D to meet their nutrient requirement.

In the diet, there are two forms of vitamin D – cholecalciferol (vitamin D_{3}) from mainly animal sources, and ergocalciferol (vitamin D_{2}) from plant, especially fungi sources. Although both forms have been shown to raise serum calcidiol levels, there is evidence that cholecalciferol has a greater effect on raising humans blood calcidiol than ergocalciferol. There is also evidence that vitamin D_{2} is less effective functionally than Vitamin D_{3} in humans and especially in cats, although similar studies have not been replicated in dogs.

Vegan sources of vitamin D include ergocalciferol and synthetic or plant sources of cholecalciferol. Mushrooms are a good plant source of natural ergocalciferol, especially after being exposed to UV-B light. Cholecalciferol in vegan dog food can be synthetic or naturally derived from lichen, a non-animal source of D3.

=== Vitamin B_{12} ===
Vitamin B_{12} is the only vitamin not present in plant sources. The largest and most complex of all the vitamins, vitamin B_{12}, is synthesized only by bacteria and some archaea species, as eukaryotes lack the enzyme. It is integral to the health and function of the nervous system, key in hematopoiesis, as well as required to synthesize methionine and catabolize propionate for energy. Grazing animals are able to obtain B_{12} when they ingest bits of soil with the grass, as the vitamin and B_{12}-producing bacteria are found in the soil and attached to the roots of the plants. After ingesting the vitamin, it is stored in the muscle and liver tissues of the animal, and subsequently passed on to the next level of the food chain.

As no animal is able to synthesize cobalamin endogenously, cobalamin should be fortified and supplemented in plant-based diets. While conventional dog foods have sources of B_{12} from their animal products (meats, organs, milk, egg, etc.), vegan dog foods meet their vitamin B_{12} requirement through pure supplementation. Nutritional yeast provides a good source of vitamin B_{12}, as long as it is already fortified.

=== Taurine ===
The sulfur-containing amino acid, taurine, is primarily found in meat and dairy products and assists in the uptake of calcium into cardiac cells, thus associated with proper myocardial functioning. Taurine is considered conditionally essential for dogs because they are able to synthesize it themselves when adequate concentrations of the other sulphur containing amino acids, methionine and cysteine, are consumed.

A low amount of sulphuric amino acids have been linked to decreased food intake, a negative nitrogen balance, and in growing dogs, stunted growth rate. Low levels of taurine increase the risk of developing cardiac conditions, namely dilated cardiomyopathy. This is further compounded with inadequancies of methionine and cysteine, which are both lacking in plant-based diets such as peas, rice, and lentils. Taurine deficiency can also lead to retinal degeneration, reproduction problems, gastrointestinal disease and decreased development and function of skeletal muscles and the central nervous system.

Plant-based diets may contain enough methionine and cysteine to meet AAFCO standards, but these values do not include the endogenous conversion to taurine. Thus, dietary supplementation with taurine is advised, especially for dogs susceptible to or diagnosed with dilated cardiomyopathy.

=== L-Carnitine ===
L-Carnitine is an amino acid that plays a key role in energy production, and facilitates the transport of fatty acids into the mitochondria. Animals, including dogs, are able to synthesize L-carnitine from the amino acid lysine in the liver. However, carnitine synthesis may not be adequate to meet their nutritional requirements and may need a dietary source, where L-carnitine is obtained directly through diet. Sources of L-carnitine are predominantly from animals. Vegetable and plant sources have significantly lower amounts of L-carnitine compared to animal sources. There is strong evidence that L-carnitine deficiency is associated with an increased risk of heart disease, such as dilated cardiomyopathy. Consequently, it can be synthetically supplemented in dog foods.

=== Omega-3 fatty acids ===
Omega-3 fatty acids are polyunsaturated fatty acids (PUFAs) that are essential for proper brain and cognitive development. They also play a large role in the production of anti-inflammatory eicosanoids, which has been shown to reduce the risk of cardiovascular disease and other inflammatory diseases. There are three types of omega-3 fatty acids; namely alpha-linolenic acid (ALA), eicosapentaenoic acid (EPA), and docosahexaenoic acid (DHA). Alpha-linoleic acid is an essential fatty acid, and is the form that is most common and widespread of the omega-3 fatty acids. Vegan sources of ALA include plant oils, nuts, flaxseed (linseed), and soy. While DHA and EPA are very important and have major implications in cognition, they are not considered essential as dogs are able to synthesize them from ALA. However, the conversion rate is relatively low, and supplementation of DHA and EPA is often helpful. Sources of DHA and EPA are also generally less widespread, and although most of the market sources of these PUFAs are from fish and fish oil, they can be sourced from algae for a vegan formulation.

Vegetable sources of omega-3 fatty acids are short-chained and need to be converted into long-chained, which are essential for dogs. The National Research Council puts the recommended daily amount at 30 mg/MBW (metabolic weight is 0.75 times the body weight). Values for assisting with conditions—including: idiopathic hyperlipidaemia, renal disease, cardiovascular disease, and osteoarthritis— range from 110mg/MBW to 310mg/MBW.

== Vegetarian vs. vegan diet ==
Vegetarianism may be defined as the practice of consuming foods that are primarily derived from plants, with or without dairy products, eggs, and/or honey and exclude meats. Because dairy and eggs are not typically marketed in dog food, many brands labelled vegetarian are vegan as well, though there are exceptions.

Veganism is a subset of vegetarianism, in which all animal-derived products are entirely excluded from one's lifestyle, including food, clothing, cosmetics, etc. Those who choose to practice veganism beyond vegetarianism typically do so because of moral, ethical, and animal welfare concerns. For this reason, people who practice veganism may wish to reflect their morals by having their pet maintained on a vegan diet as well.

== See also ==
- Insect-based pet food
- Plant-based cat food
- List of vegetarian and vegan companies
- Sustainable food system
