= Oxepane =

Names
- Preferred IUPAC name Oxepane
- Other names Hexamethylene oxide

Identifiers
CAS Number	592-90-5
3D model (JSmol)	Interactive image
ChEBI	CHEBI:49106
ChemSpider	11129
ECHA InfoCard	100.008.890
EC Number	209-777-2
PubChem CID	11618
UNII	9T7S69J4PS
CompTox Dashboard (EPA)	DTXSID1060471
- InChI: InChI=1S/C6H12O/c1-2-4-6-7-5-3-1/h1-6H2 Key: UHHKSVZZTYJVEG-UHFFFAOYSA-N
- SMILES: C1CCCOCC1

Properties
Chemical formula	C_{6}H_{12}O
Molar mass	100.15888
- Except where otherwise noted, data are given for materials in their standard state (at 25 °C [77 °F], 100 kPa). verify (what is ?) Infobox references

Oxepane is a heterocyclic chemical compound with the formula C_{6}H_{12}O: a cycloheptane in which one methylene group is replaced by oxygen.

Oxepane can be polymerized by cationic initiators such as (C_{2}H_{5})_{3}OSbCl_{6} to form a crystalline solid with a melting point around 56–58 °C.
