= Plastic =

Material of a wide range of synthetic or semi-synthetic organic solids

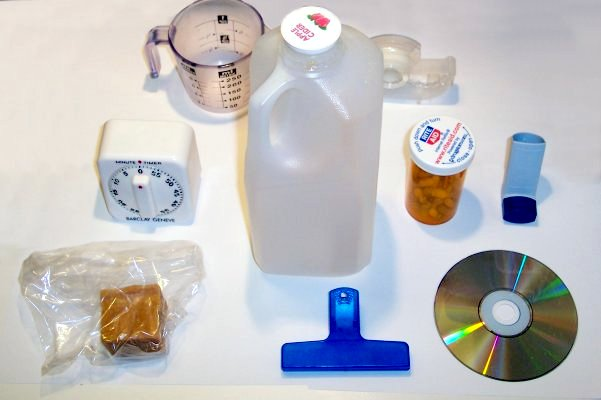
Household items made of various types of plastics

Plastics are a wide range of synthetic or semisynthetic materials composed primarily of polymers. Their defining characteristic, plasticity, allows them to be molded, extruded, or pressed into a diverse range of solid forms. This adaptability, combined with a wide range of other properties such as low weight, durability, flexibility, chemical resistance, low toxicity, and low-cost production, has led to their widespread use around the world. While most plastics are produced from natural gas and petroleum, a growing minority are produced from renewable resources such as polylactic acid.

Between 1950 and 2017, 9.2 billion metric tons of plastic are estimated to have been made, with more than half of this amount being produced since 2004. In 2023 alone, preliminary figures indicate that more than 400 million metric tons of plastic were produced worldwide. If global trends in plastic demand continue, it is projected that annual global plastic production will exceed 1.3 billion tons by 2060. The primary uses for plastic include packaging, which makes up about 40% of its usage, and building and construction, which makes up about 20% of its usage.

The success and dominance of plastics since the early 20th century have had major benefits for mankind, ranging from medical devices to lightweight construction materials. The sewage systems in many countries rely on the resiliency and adaptability of polyvinyl chloride. It is also true that plastics are the basis of widespread environmental concerns, due to their slow decomposition rate in natural ecosystems. Most plastic produced has not been reused, thus the need for microplastic remediation. Some are unsuitable for reuse. Much ends up in landfills or as plastic pollution. Particular concern focuses on microplastics. Marine plastic pollution, for example, creates garbage patches. Of all the plastic discarded so far, some 14% has been incinerated and less than 10% has been recycled.

In developed economies, about a third of plastic is used in packaging and roughly the same in buildings in applications such as piping, plumbing or vinyl siding. Other uses include automobiles (up to 20% plastic), furniture, and toys. In the developing world, the applications of plastic may differ; 42% of India's consumption is used in packaging. Worldwide, about 50 kg of plastic is produced annually per person, with production doubling every ten years.

The world's first fully synthetic plastic was Bakelite, invented in New York in 1907 by Leo Baekeland, who coined the term plastics. Dozens of different types of plastics are produced today, such as polyethylene, which is widely used in product packaging, and polyvinyl chloride (PVC), used in construction and pipes because of its strength and durability. Many chemists have contributed to the materials science of plastics, including Nobel laureate Hermann Staudinger, who has been called "the father of polymer chemistry", and Herman Mark, known as "the father of polymer physics".

== Etymology ==
The word plastic derives from the Ancient Greek πλαστικός (plastikos), meaning "capable of being shaped or molded," which itself comes from πλαστός (plastos), meaning "molded" or "formed." In modern usage, the word plastic most commonly refers to the solid synthetic products of petrochemical-derived manufacturing.

The word plasticity, as a noun, specifically refers to the deformability of the materials used in the manufacture of plastics. Plasticity allows molding, extrusion, or compression into a variety of shapes, including films, fibers, plates, tubes, bottles, and boxes, among many others. In materials science, plasticity also has a more technical definition, describing the nonreversible change in form of solid substances when subjected to external forces. However, this definition extends beyond the scope of this article.

== Structure ==
Most plastics contain organic polymers. The vast majority of these polymers are formed from chains of carbon atoms, with or without the attachment of oxygen, nitrogen or sulfur atoms. These chains comprise many repeating units formed from monomers. Each polymer chain consists of several thousand repeating units. The backbone is the part of the chain that is on the main path, linking together a large number of repeat units. To customize the properties of a plastic, different molecular groups called side chains hang from this backbone; they are usually attached to the monomers before the monomers themselves are linked together to form the polymer chain. The structure of these side chains influences the properties of the polymer.

== Classifications ==
Plastics are usually classified by their chemical structure of the polymer's backbone and side chains. Important groups classified in this way include the acrylics, polyesters, silicones, polyurethanes, and halogenated plastics. Plastics can be classified by the chemical process used in their synthesis, such as condensation, polyaddition, and cross-linking. They can also be classified by their physical properties, including hardness, density, tensile strength, thermal resistance, and glass transition temperature. Plastics can additionally be classified by their resistance and reactions to various substances and processes, such as exposure to organic solvents, oxidation, and ionizing radiation. Other classifications of plastics are based on qualities relevant to manufacturing or product design for a particular purpose. Examples include thermoplastics, thermosets, conductive polymers, biodegradable plastics, engineering plastics and elastomers.

=== Thermoplastics and thermosetting polymers ===
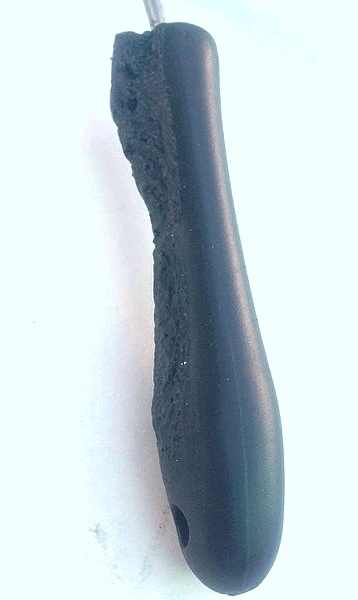
The plastic handle of a kitchen utensil, deformed by heat. This behavior, in which the plastic resolidifies in a new shape after melting, is characteristic of thermoplastics.

One important classification of plastics is the degree to which the chemical processes used to make them are reversible or not.

Thermoplastics do not undergo chemical change in their composition when heated and thus can be molded repeatedly. Examples include polyethylene (PE), polypropylene (PP), polystyrene (PS), and polyvinyl chloride (PVC).

Thermosetting polymers, also known as thermosets, can melt and take shape only once: after they have solidified, they stay solid and retain their shape permanently. If reheated, thermosets decompose rather than melt. Examples of thermosets include epoxy resin, polyimide, and Bakelite. The vulcanization of rubber is an example of this process. Before heating in the presence of sulfur, natural rubber (polyisoprene) is a sticky, slightly runny material, and after vulcanization, the product is dry and rigid.

Thermosets consist of closely cross-linked polymers. Cross-links are shown as red dots in the figure.	Elastomers consist of wide-meshed cross-linked polymers. The wide mesh allows the material to stretch under tensile load.	Thermoplastics consist of non-crosslinked polymers, often with a semi-crystalline structure (shown in red). They have a glass transition temperature and are meltable.

=== Commodity, engineering, and high-performance plastics ===
==== Commodity plastics ====
Chemical structures and uses of some common plastics

Commodity plastics or commodity polymers are plastics produced in high volumes for applications such as packaging, food containers, and household products, including both disposable products and durable goods. In contrast to engineering plastics, commodity plastics tend to be inexpensive to produce and exhibit relatively weak mechanical properties. Widely used commodity plastics include polyethylene (PE), polypropylene (PP), polystyrene (PS), polyvinyl chloride (PVC), poly(methyl methacrylate) (PMMA), and polyethylene terephthalate (PET). Products made from commodity plastics include disposable plates, disposable cups, photographic and magnetic tape, clothing, reusable bags, medical trays, and seeding trays.

Approximately 80% of global plastic production includes commodity plastics, a type of plastics primarily chosen for their low cost and ease of manufacturing. These plastics are mass-produced and ubiquitous in packaging, food containers, and single-use items. Most commodity plastics are identifiable by their Resin Identification Codes (RICs), a standardized numbering system developed by ASTM International.

Polyethylene terephthalate (PET or PETE)
High-density polyethylene (HDPE or PE-HD)
Polyvinyl chloride (PVC or V)
Low-density polyethylene (LDPE or PE-LD),
Polypropylene (PP)
Polystyrene (PS)

Beyond the six most widely recognized listed above, there are more commodity plastics that are also mass-produced and commonly used, such as polyurethanes (PURs). PURs are a class of plastics also designated as commodity plastics due to their low cost, ease of manufacturing, and versatility. However, they lack RICs because they encompass many chemically diverse formulations such as foams and adhesives.

Packaging represents the largest application of commodity plastics, consuming 146 million metric tons (36% of global production) in 2015 alone. Beyond packaging, however, these plastics are critical in various other fields such as agriculture, construction, consumer goods, and healthcare.

Although many traits such as durability and resistance to biodegradability are desirable in various applications, they have led to significant environmental issues. An estimated 8 to 12 million tons of plastic enter oceans annually, primarily from mismanaged packaging waste. Commodity plastics account for the majority of this pollution, as their recycling rates remain low (e.g., only ~9% of all plastics are recycled globally). Microplastics derived from their degradation further threaten ecosystems and human health.

The roughly 20% of remaining plastics are engineering and high-performance plastics, valued for their strength, heat resistance, chemical resistance, and other exceptional qualities. These kinds of plastics are more expensive, less common, and often used in more specialized applications.

By Polymer. View chart definition.

Global plastic production by polymer type (2015)
Polymer	Production (Mt)	Percentage of all plastics (%)	Polymer type	Thermal character
Low-density polyethylene (LDPE)	64	15.7	Polyolefin	Thermoplastic
High-density polyethylene (HDPE)	52	12.8	Polyolefin	Thermoplastic
polypropylene (PP)	68	16.7	Polyolefin	Thermoplastic
Polystyrene (PS)	25	6.1	Unsaturated polyolefin	Thermoplastic
Polyvinyl chloride (PVC)	38	9.3	Halogenated	Thermoplastic
Polyethylene terephthalate (PET)	33	8.1	Condensation	Thermoplastic
Polyurethane (PUR)	27	6.6	Condensation	Thermoset
PP&A Fibers	59	14.5	Condensation	Thermoplastic
All Others	16	3.9	Various	Varies
Additives	25	6.1	-	-
Total	407	100	-	-

==== Engineering plastics ====
Engineering plastics are more robust and are used to manufacture products such as vehicle parts, building and construction materials, and some machine parts. In some cases, they are polymer blends consisting mixtures of polymers. Engineering plastics can replace metals in vehicles, lowering their weight and improving fuel efficiency by 6–8%. Roughly 50% of the volume of modern cars is made of plastic, but this only accounts for 12–17% of the vehicle weight.

- Acrylonitrile butadiene styrene (ABS): electronic equipment cases (e.g., computer monitors, printers, keyboards) and drainage pipes
- High-impact polystyrene (HIPS): refrigerator liners, food packaging, and vending cups
- Polycarbonate (PC): compact discs, eyeglasses, riot shields, security windows, traffic lights, and lenses
- Polycarbonate + acrylonitrile butadiene styrene (PC + ABS): a blend of PC and ABS that creates a stronger plastic used in car interior and exterior parts and in mobile phone bodies
- Polyethylene + acrylonitrile butadiene styrene (PE + ABS): a slippery blend of PE and ABS used in low-duty dry bearings
- Polymethyl methacrylate (PMMA) (acrylic): contact lenses (of the original "hard" variety), glazing (best known in this form by its various trade names around the world; e.g. Perspex, Plexiglas, and Oroglas), fluorescent-light diffusers, and rear light covers for vehicles. It also forms the basis of artistic and commercial acrylic paints, when suspended in water with the use of other agents.
- Silicones (polysiloxanes): heat-resistant resins used mainly as sealants but also used for high-temperature cooking utensils and as a base resin for industrial paints
- Urea-formaldehyde (UF): one of the aminoplasts used as a multi-colorable alternative to phenolics: used as a wood adhesive (for plywood, chipboard, hardboard) and electrical switch housings

==== High-performance plastics ====
High-performance plastics are a category of polymers exhibiting superior properties compared to commodity and engineering plastics. These plastics can withstand high temperatures, often above 302°F (150°C), are highly resistant to chemical corrosion and degradation, have excellent mechanical and electric properties, and are lightweight and versatile.

- Aramids: best known for their use in the manufacture of body armor, this class of heat-resistant and strong synthetic fibers also has applications in aerospace and military and includes Kevlar, Nomex, and Twaron.
- Ultra-high-molecular-weight polyethylenes (UHMWPE)
- Polyetheretherketone (PEEK): strong, chemical- and heat-resistant thermoplastic; its biocompatibility allows for use in medical implant applications and aerospace moldings. It is one of the most expensive commercial polymers.
- Polyetherimide (PEI): a high-temperature, chemically stable polymer that does not crystallize
- Polyimide: a high-temperature plastic used in materials such as Kapton tape
- Polysulfone (PS): high-temperature melt-processable resin used in membranes, filtration media, water heater dip tubes and other high-temperature applications
- Polytetrafluoroethylene (PTFE): heat-resistant, low-friction coatings used in non-stick surfaces for frying pans, plumber's tape, and water slides
- Polyamide-imide (PAI): high-performance engineering plastic extensively used in high-performance gears, switches, transmissions, and other automotive components and aerospace parts
- Polyphenylene sulfide (PPS): extreme chemical resistance, flame retardancy, and thermal stability (up to 428°F).
- Polyethersulfone (PES): best known for their clarity, high-temperature resistance (up to 392°F), and biocompatibility. Commonly used in medical devices, food-grade equipment, and aerospace lighting.
- Polyvinylidene fluoride (PVDF): a nonreactive thermoplastic fluoropolymer known for extreme chemical resistance, ultraviolet stability, and piezoelectric properties. Commonly used in semiconductor tubing, lithium-ion battery binders, and architectural coatings.
- Liquid-crystal polymers (LCPs): a class of polymers combining the properties of both liquids and crystals, known for extreme dimensional stability, low thermal expansion, and high dielectric strength. Commonly used in miniature electronics, fiber-optic cables, and surgical devices.
- Polyimides (PIs): a class of high-performance thermosets, able to operate up to 572°F and best known for their excellent dielectric properties and radiation resistance. Commonly used in flexible printed circuits, space suit layers, and jet engine components.
- Polybenzimidazole (PBI): extremely high heat resistance (up to 752°F short-term), low outgassing, and flame resistance. Commonly used in firefighting gear, semiconductor tools, and aerospace thermal shields.
- Bismaleimide (BMI): known for its high glass transition temperature (around 482°F) and low moisture absorption. Commonly used in composite aircraft matrices and military radar systems.
- Cyanate esters: known for their low dielectric loss and space-grade radiation resistance. Commonly used in satellite components and radar antennas.

=== Amorphous and crystalline plastics ===
Many plastics are amorphous, meaning they lack a highly ordered molecular structure. Crystalline plastics exhibit a pattern of more regularly spaced atoms, such as high-density polyethylene (HDPE), polybutylene terephthalate (PBT), and polyether ether ketone (PEEK). However, some plastics are partially amorphous and partially crystalline in molecular structure, giving them both a melting point and one or more glass transitions (the temperature above which the extent of localized molecular flexibility is substantially increased). These so-called semi-crystalline plastics include polyethylene, polypropylene, polyvinyl chloride, polyamides (nylons), polyesters and some polyurethanes.

=== Conductive polymers ===
Conductive polymers include certain kinds of polyacetylene, which attracted much academic interest. Conductivities as high as 80 kilosiemens per centimeter (kS/cm) have been achieved in such materials, although that value is not comparable to that of copper (60 MS/cm). A practical conductive plastic is poly(3,4-ethylenedioxythiophene) polystyrene sulfonate.

=== Biodegradable plastics and bioplastics ===
==== Biodegradable plastics ====
Biodegradable plastics are plastics that are designed to degrade (break down) after use through exposure to biological factors, such as sunlight, ultraviolet radiation, moisture, bacteria, insects, enzymes, or wind abrasion. The most popular such materials are polylactic acids (PLAs), which have the added attraction that they are derived from non-petrochemical, renewable materials. PLAs have achieved only limited commercial success.

==== Bioplastics ====
While most plastics are produced from petrochemicals, bioplastics are made substantially from renewable plant materials such as cellulose and starch. Due both to the finite limits of fossil fuel reserves and to rising levels of greenhouse gases caused primarily by the burning of those fuels, the development of bioplastics is a growing field. Global production capacity for bio-based plastics is estimated at 327,000 tonnes per year. In contrast, global production of polyethylene (PE) and polypropylene (PP), the world's leading petrochemical-derived polyolefins, was estimated at more than 150 million tonnes in 2015.

== Plastic industry ==
The plastic industry includes the global production, compounding, conversion and sale of plastic products. Although the Middle East and Russia produce most of the required petrochemical raw materials, the production of plastic is concentrated in the global East and West. The plastic industry comprises a huge number of companies and can be divided into several sectors:

=== Production ===
Between 1950 and 2017, 9.2 billion tonnes of plastic are estimated to have been made, with more than half of this having been produced since 2004. Since the birth of the plastic industry in the 1950s, global production has increased enormously, reaching 400 million tonnes a year in 2021; this is up from 381 million metric tonnes in 2015 (excluding additives). From the 1950s, rapid growth occurred in the use of plastics for packaging, in building and construction, and in other sectors. If global trends on plastic demand continue, it is estimated that by 2050 annual global plastic production will exceed 1.1-billion tonnes annually.

Polypropylene plants

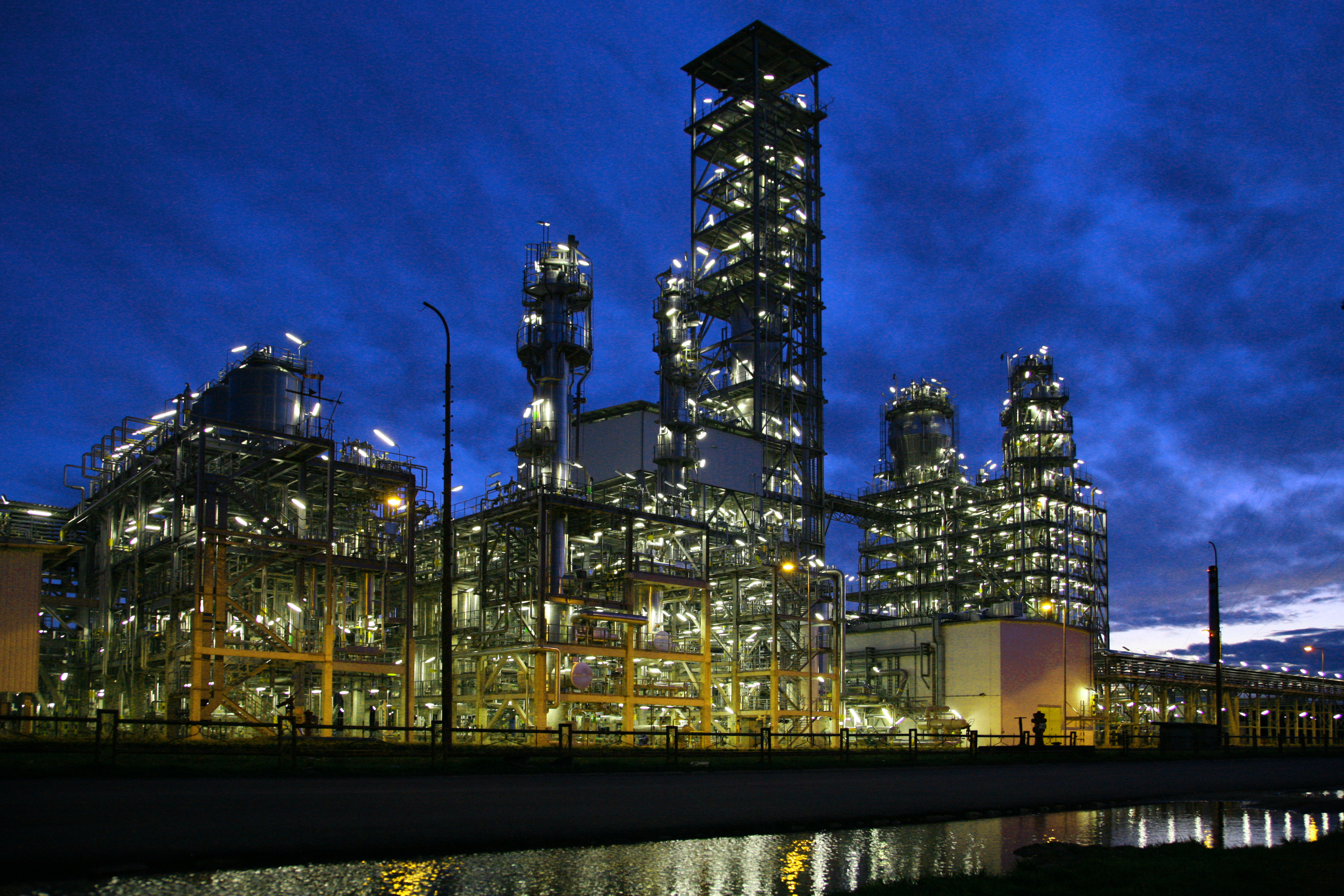
A Slovnaft facility in Bratislava, Slovakia

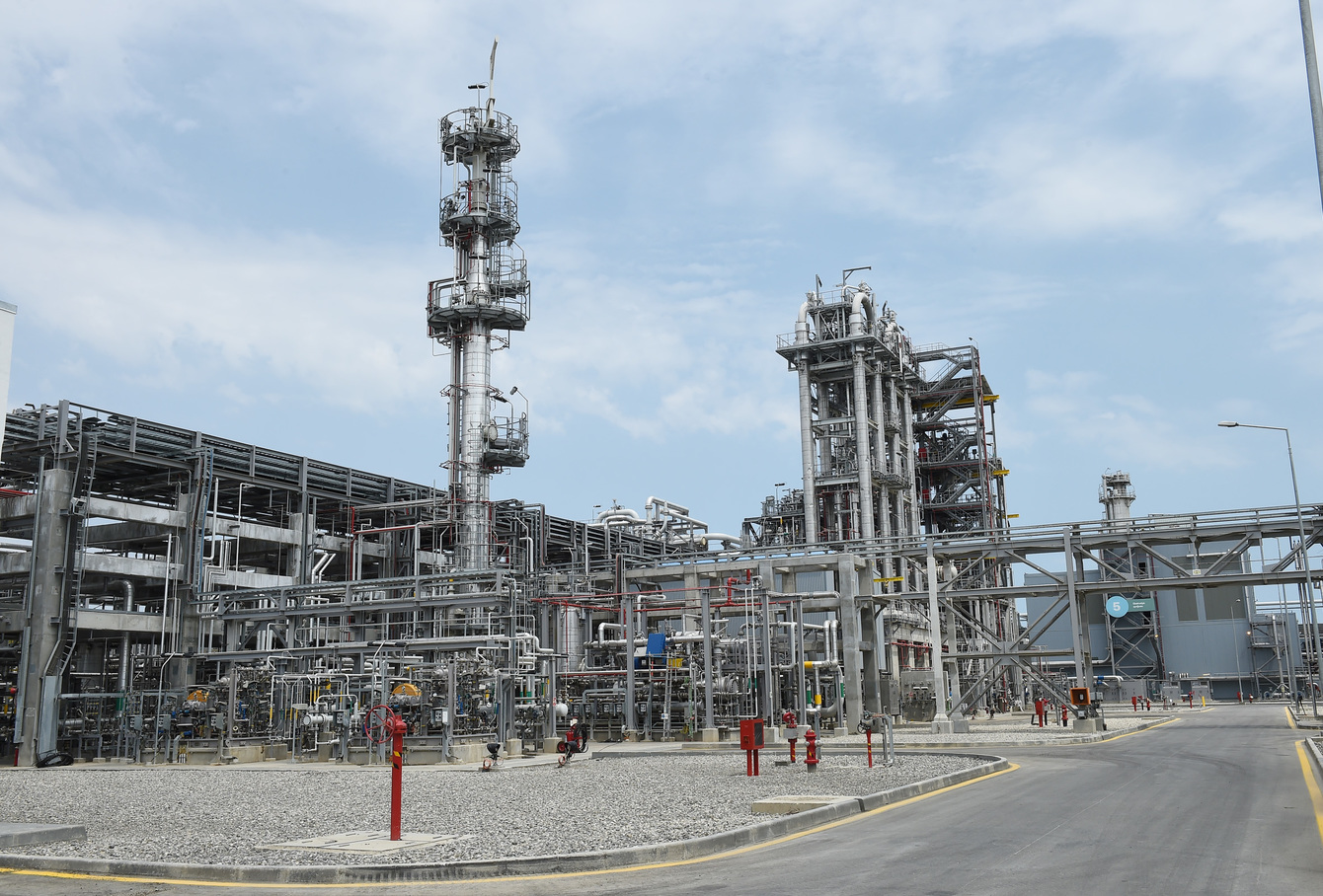
A SOCAR Polymer polypropylene plant in Sumgayit, Azerbaijan
View chart definition.
Annual global plastic production 1950–2015. Vertical lines denote the 1973–1975 recession and the 2008 financial crisis which caused brief lowering of plastic production.

Plastics are produced in chemical plants by the polymerization of their starting materials (monomers); which are almost always petrochemical in nature. Such facilities are normally large and are visually similar to oil refineries, with sprawling pipework running throughout. The large size of these plants allows them to exploit economies of scale. Despite this, plastic production is not particularly monopolized, with about 100 companies accounting for 90% of global production. This includes a mixture of private and state-owned enterprises. Roughly half of all production takes place in East Asia, with China being the largest single producer. Major international producers include:

Global plastic production (2020)
Region	Global production
China	31%
Japan	3%
Rest of Asia	17%
NAFTA	19%
Latin America	4%
Europe	16%
CIS	3%
Middle East & Africa	7%

- BASF
- Braskem
- Dow Chemical
- ExxonMobil
- Indorama Ventures
- LyondellBasell
- SABIC
- Shin-Etsu Chemical
- Sibur
- Sinopec

Historically, Europe and North America have dominated global plastics production. However, since 2010 Asia has emerged as a significant producer, with China accounting for 31% of total plastic resin production in 2020. Regional differences in the volume of plastics production are driven by user demand, the price of fossil fuel feedstocks, and investments made in the petrochemical industry. For example, since 2010 more than US$200 billion has been invested in the United States in new plastic and chemical plants, stimulated by the low cost of raw materials. In the European Union (EU), too, heavy investments have been made in the plastics industry, which employs more than 1.6-million people with a turnover of more than 360 billion euros per year. In China in 2016 there were more than 15,000 plastic manufacturing companies, generating more than US$366 billion in revenue.

In 2017, the global plastics market was dominated by thermoplastics– polymers that can be melted and recast. Thermoplastics include polyethylene (PE), polyethylene terephthalate (PET), polypropylene (PP), polyvinyl chloride (PVC), polystyrene (PS), and synthetic fibers, which together represent 86% of all plastics.

=== Compounding ===
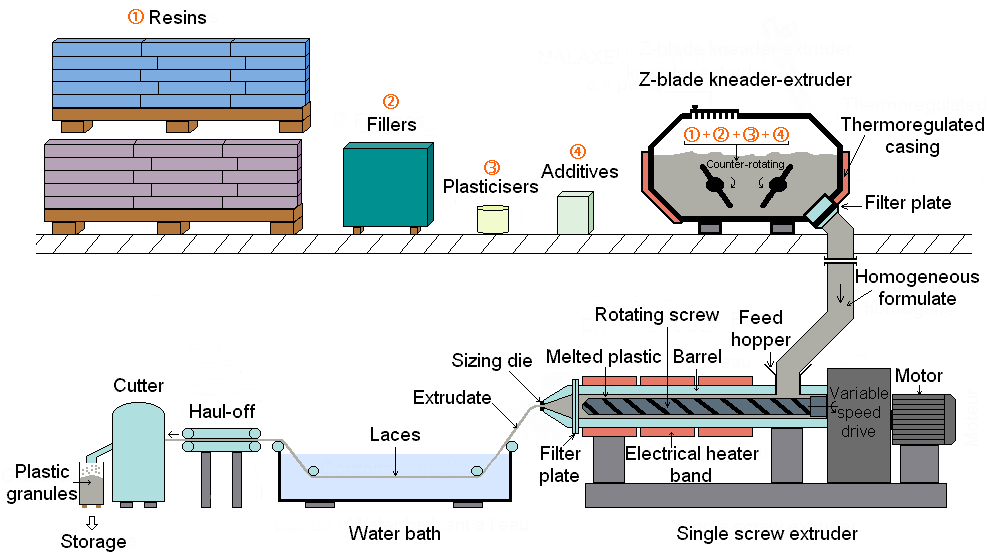
Plastic compounding scheme for a thermosoftening material

Plastic is not sold as a pure unadulterated substance but is instead mixed with various chemicals and other materials. These additives include substances such as stabilizers, plasticizers, and dyes, which are intended to improve the lifespan, workability, or appearance of the final item. In some cases, two types of polymers are combined to form a polymer blend, such as high impact polystyrene. Large companies may do their own compounding prior to production, but some producers have it done by a third party. Companies that specialize in this work are known as Compounders.

The compounding of thermosetting plastic is relatively straightforward; as it remains liquid until it is cured into its final form. For thermosoftening materials, which are used to make the majority of products, it is necessary to melt the plastic in order to mix-in the additives. This involves heating it to anywhere between 150–320 °C (300–610 °F). Molten plastic is viscous and exhibits laminar flow, leading to poor mixing. Compounding is therefore done using extrusion equipment, which is able to supply the necessary heat and mixing to give a properly dispersed product.

The concentrations of most additives are usually quite low, however high levels can be added to create Masterbatch products. The additives in these are concentrated but still properly dispersed in the host resin. Masterbatch granules can be mixed with cheaper bulk polymer and will release their additives during processing to give a homogeneous final product. This can be cheaper than working with a fully compounded material and is particularly common for the introduction of color.

=== Converting ===
Short video on injection molding (9 min 37 s)

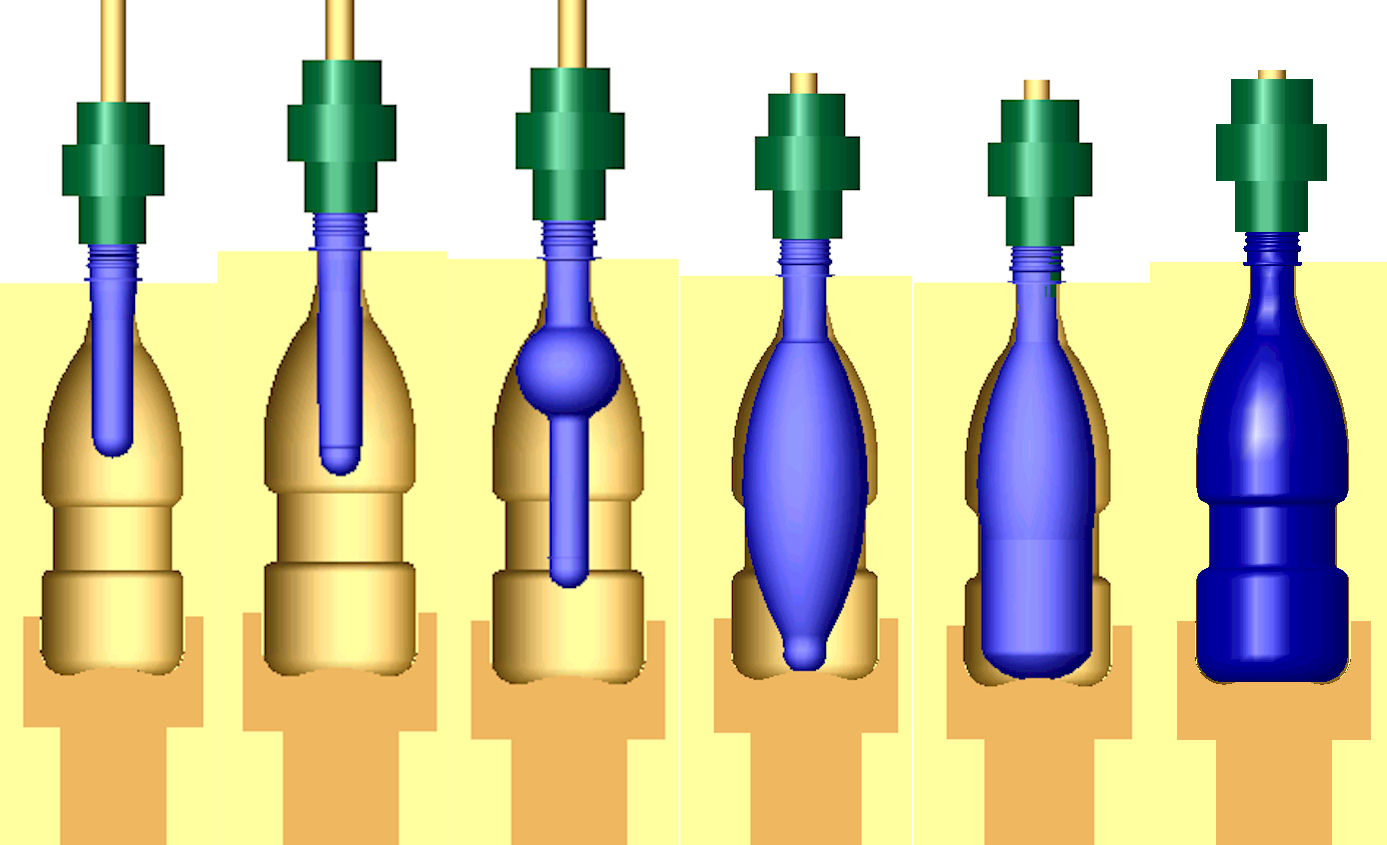
Blow molding a plastic drinks bottle

Converters (sometimes known as processors) are companies or specialists that fabricate finished plastic products from raw materials, often in the form of resins, pellets, or films.

- Injection molding: involves injecting molten plastic into a mold cavity under high pressure. The plastic solidifies in the mold to form the desired shape.
- Blow molding: involves heating a plastic tube called a parison and inflating it inside a mold to form hollow products such as bottles and toys.
- Rotational molding: involves rotating a mold on two axes while it is heated. Plastic powder is added to the mold and melts and sticks to the walls as the mold is rotated, which forms thick-walled hollow parts such as intermediate bulk containers.
- Casting: involves pouring liquid resin into a mold where it solidifies into a predesigned shape.
- Film blowing: involves heating a polymer and blowing it into a thin, continuous sheet. Commonly used for making polyethylene and polypropylene films used in packaging.
- Spinning: involves transforming a polymer melt or solution into continuous strands
- 3D printing: involves three-dimensionally printing an object layer by layer following a digital model using computer-aided design software.

For thermosetting materials, the process is slightly different, as the plastics are liquid to begin with and but must be cured to give solid products, but much of the equipment is broadly similar.

The most commonly produced plastic consumer products include packaging made from LDPE (e.g. bags, containers, food packaging film), containers made from HDPE (e.g. milk bottles, shampoo bottles, ice cream tubs), and PET (e.g. bottles for water and other drinks). Together these products account for around 36% of plastics use in the world. Most of them (e.g. disposable cups, plates, cutlery, takeaway containers, carrier bags) are used for only a short period, many for less than a day. The use of plastics in building and construction, textiles, transportation and electrical equipment also accounts for a substantial share of the plastics market. Plastic items used for such purposes generally have longer life spans. They may be in use for periods ranging from around five years (e.g. textiles and electrical equipment) to more than 20 years (e.g. construction materials, industrial machinery).

Plastic consumption differs among countries and communities, with some form of plastic having made its way into most people's lives. North America (i.e. the North American Free Trade Agreement or NAFTA region) accounts for 21% of global plastic consumption, closely followed by China (20%) and Western Europe (18%). In North America and Europe, there is high per capita plastic consumption (94 kg and 85 kg/capita/year, respectively). In China, there is lower per capita consumption (58 kg/capita/year), but high consumption nationally because of its large population.

== Gallery ==
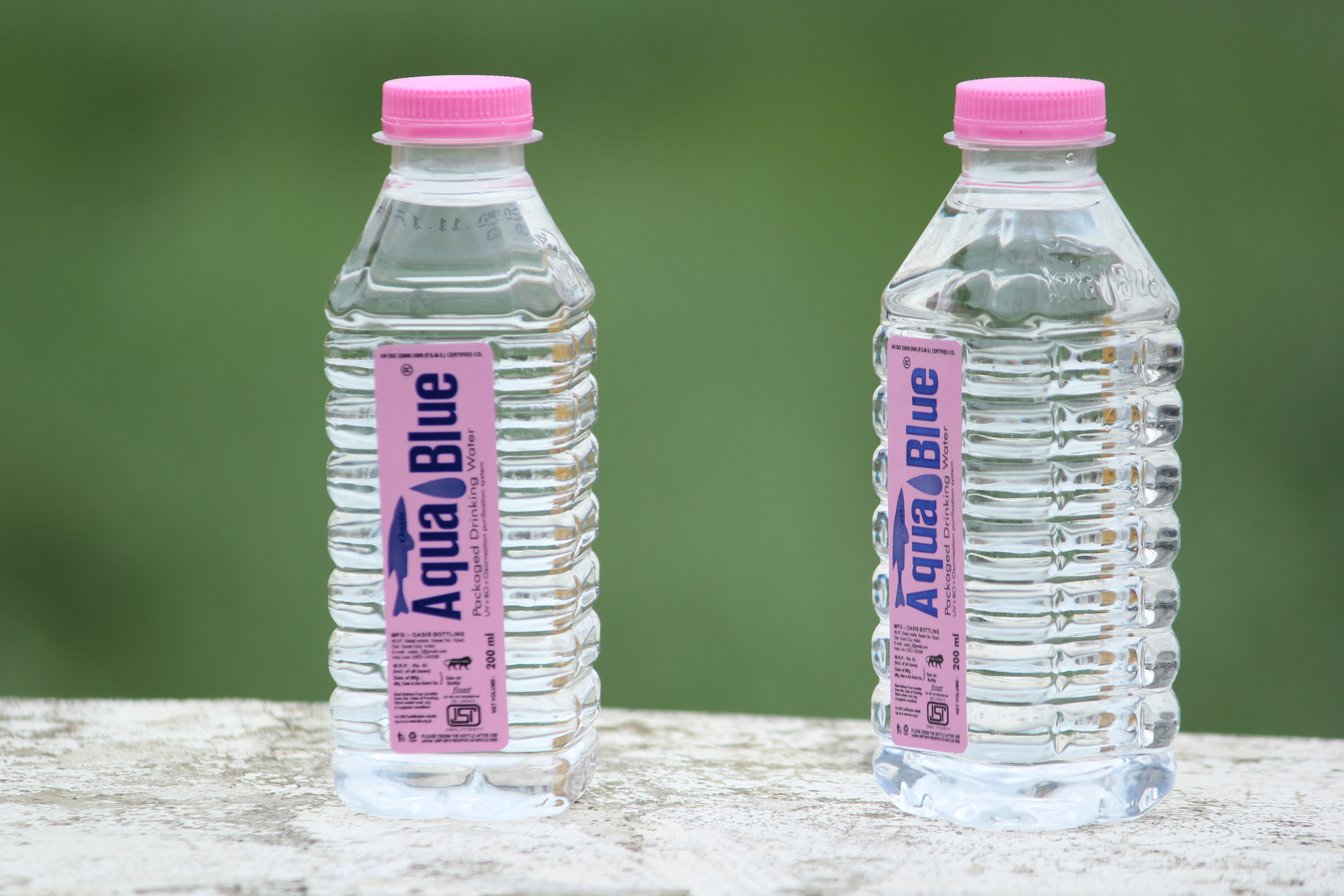
Water bottles made of PET

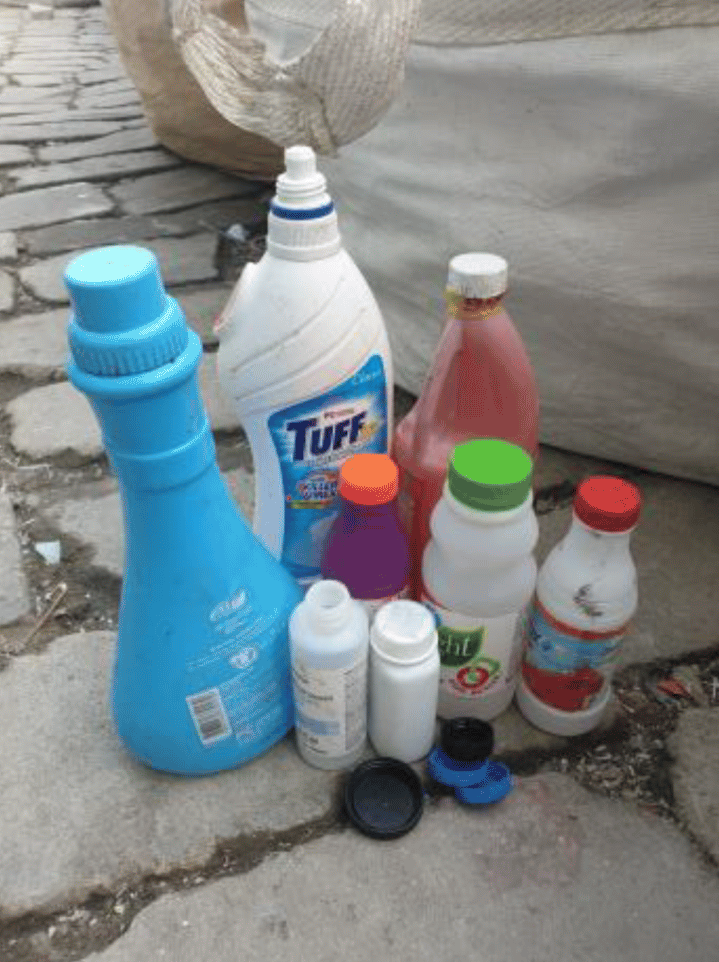
High density polythene (HDPE) is used for making sturdy containers; transparent containers may be made of PET.

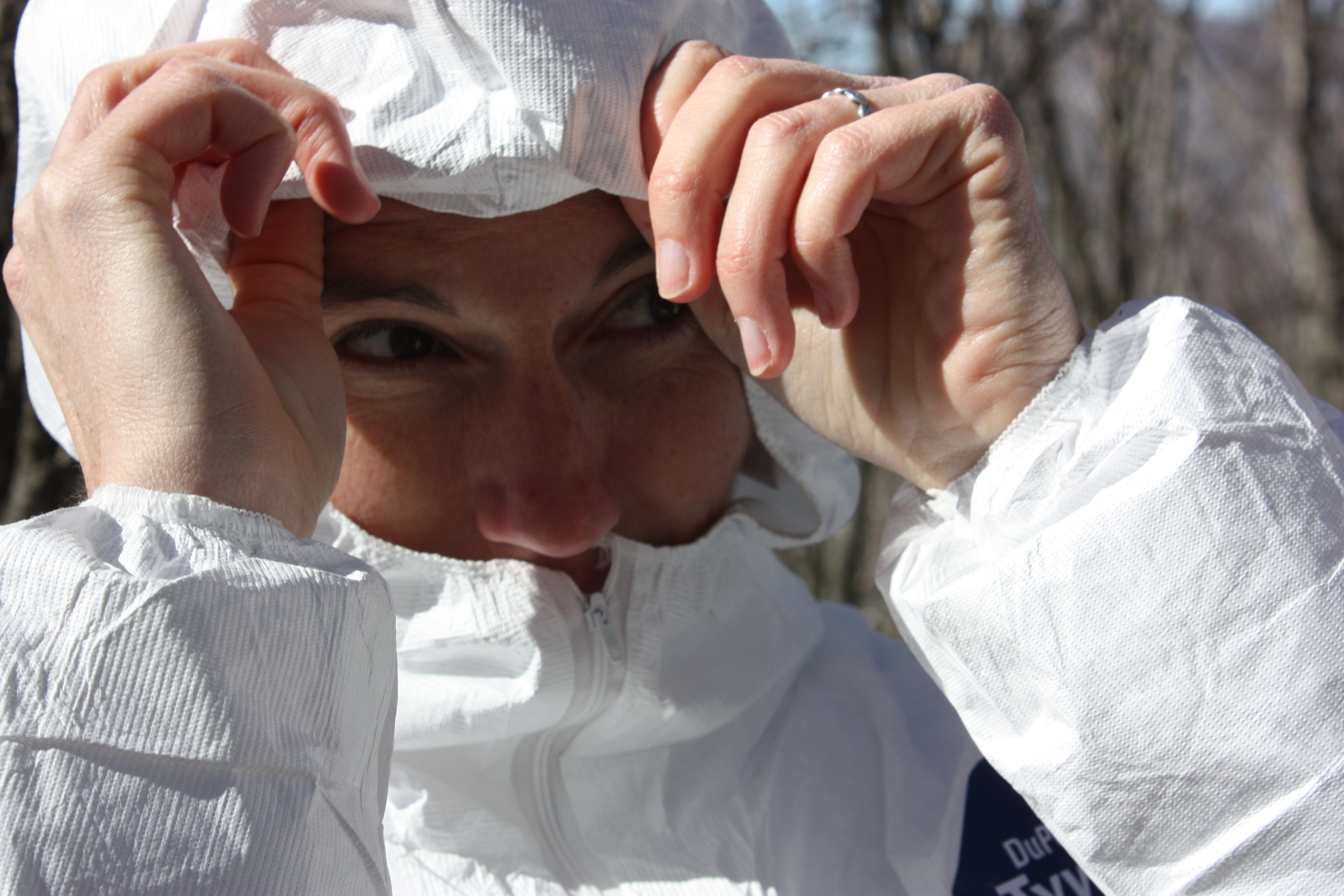
Disposable suits can be made from non-woven HDPE fabric.

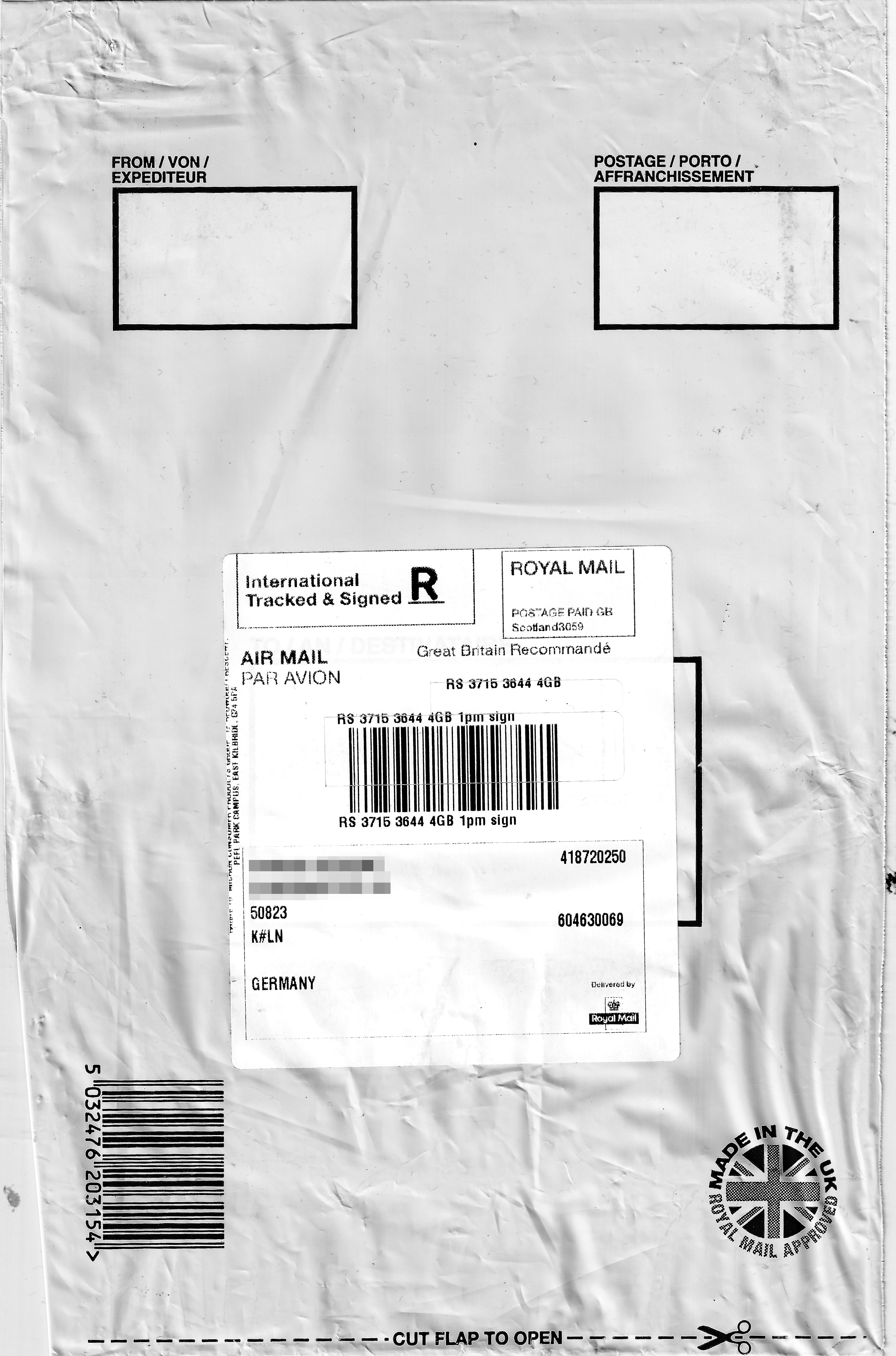
Plastic mailing envelopes made of HDPE

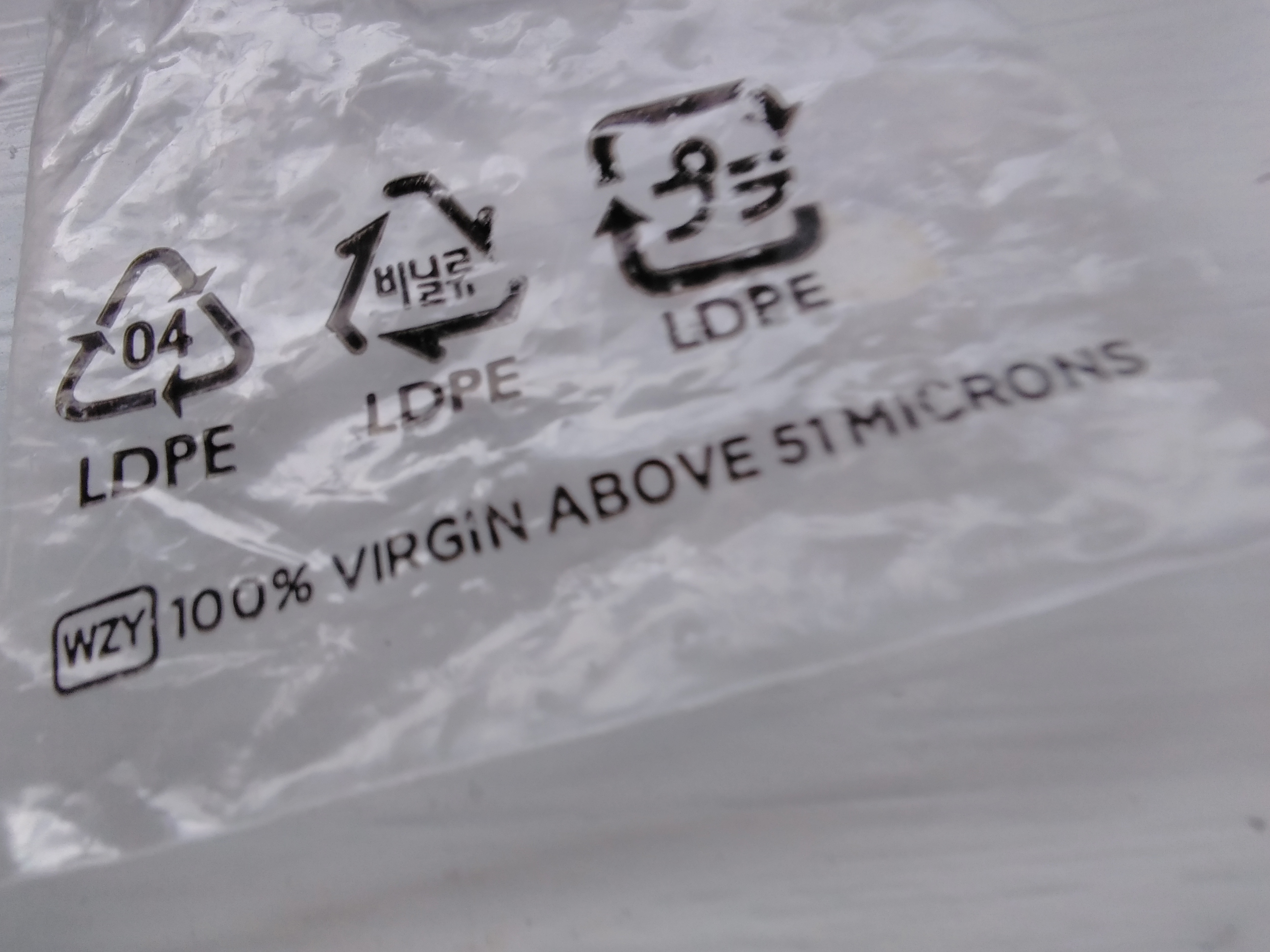
A Ziploc bag made of LDPE

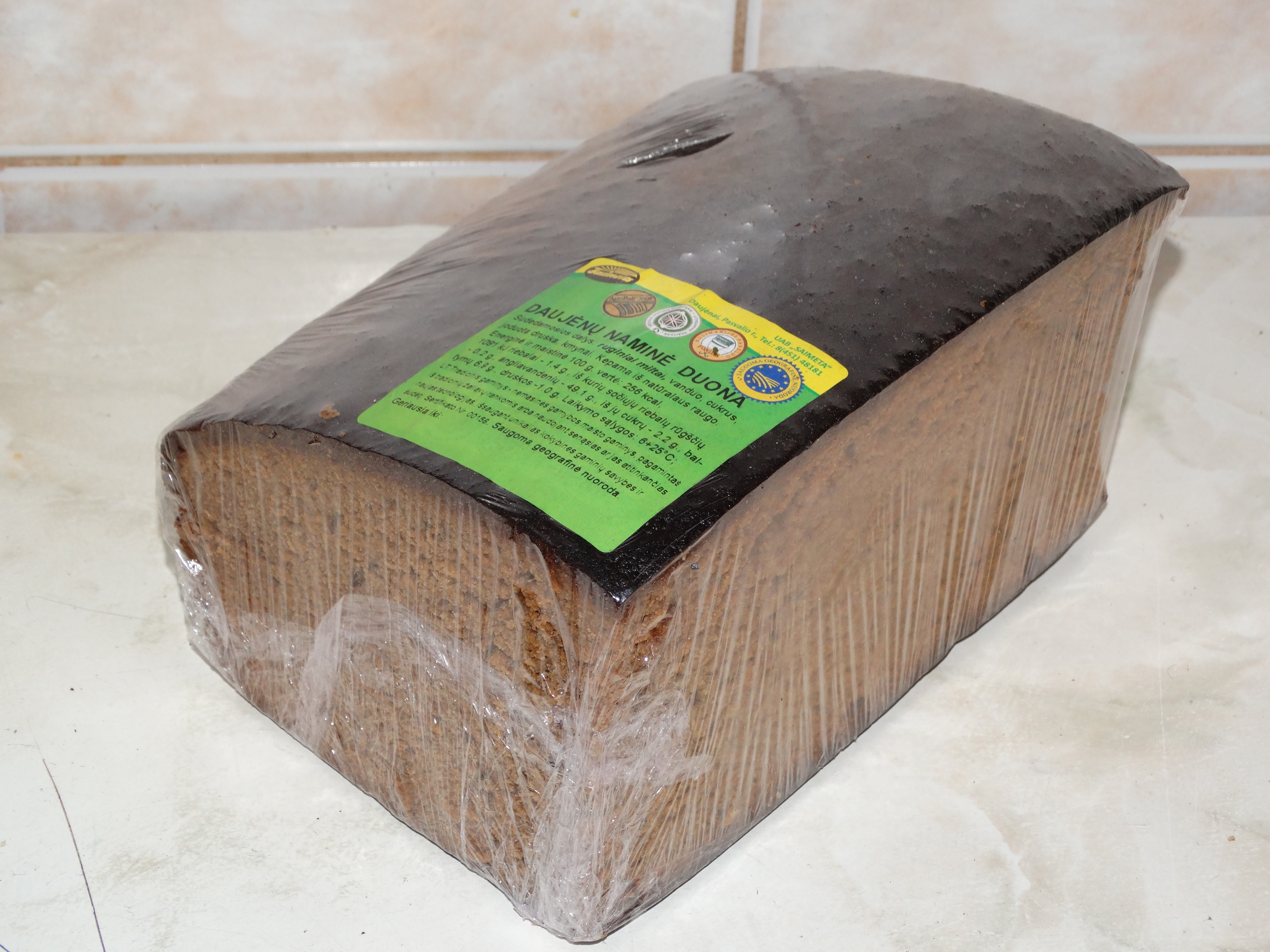
Food wrap made of LDPE

Metalized polypropylene film is a commonly used snack pack material.

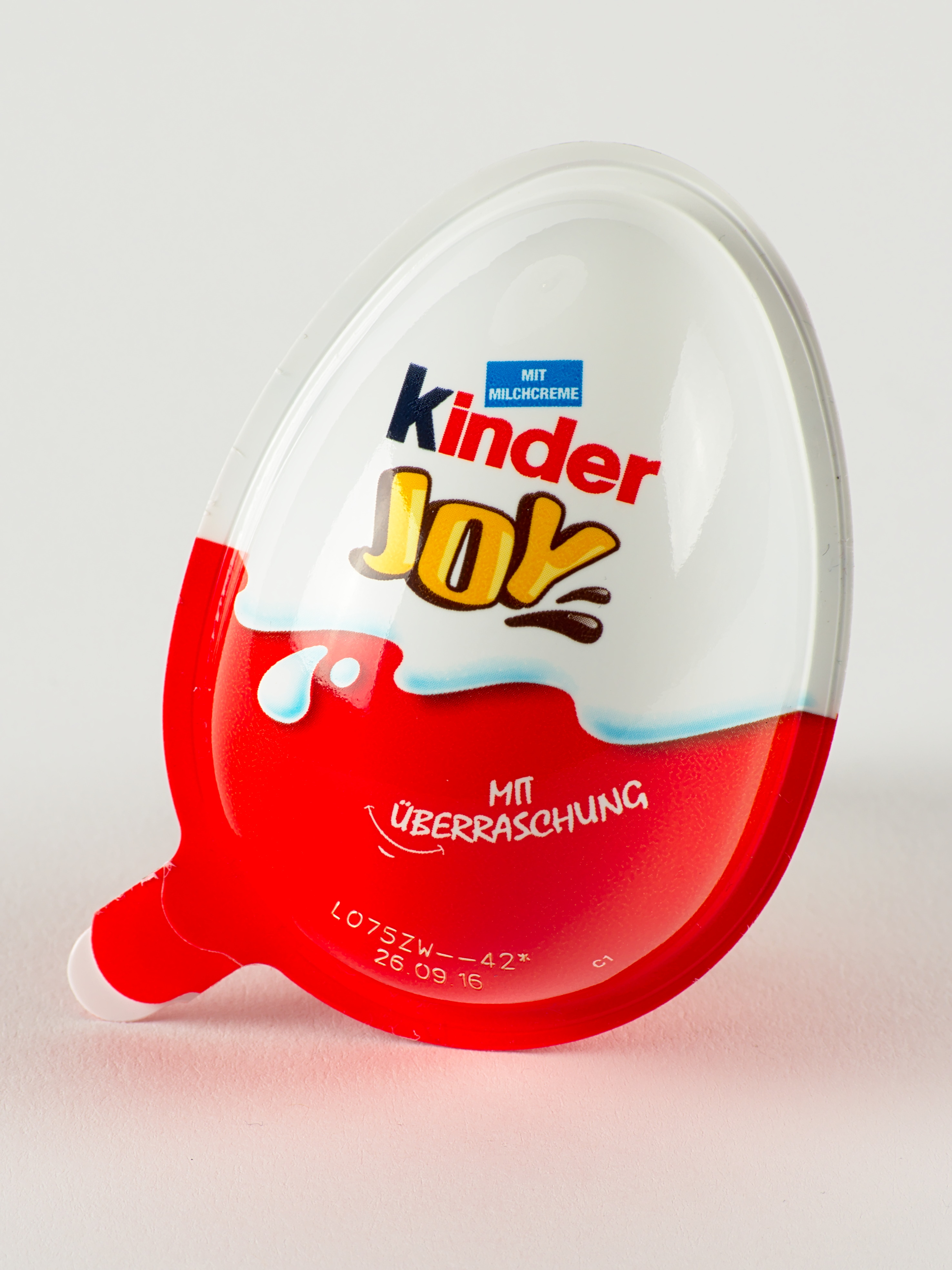
Kinder Joy shell made of polypropylene

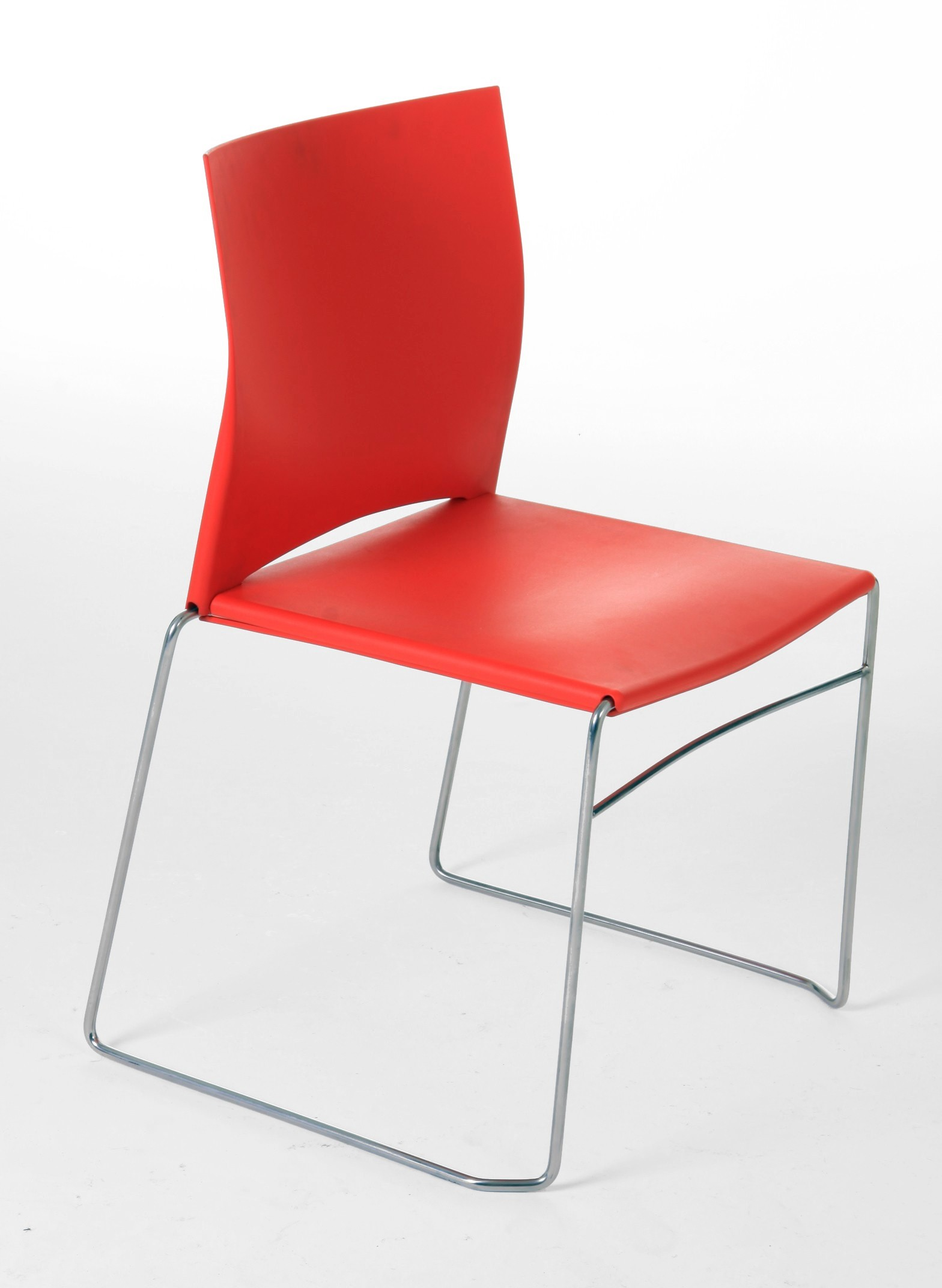
A polypropylene chair

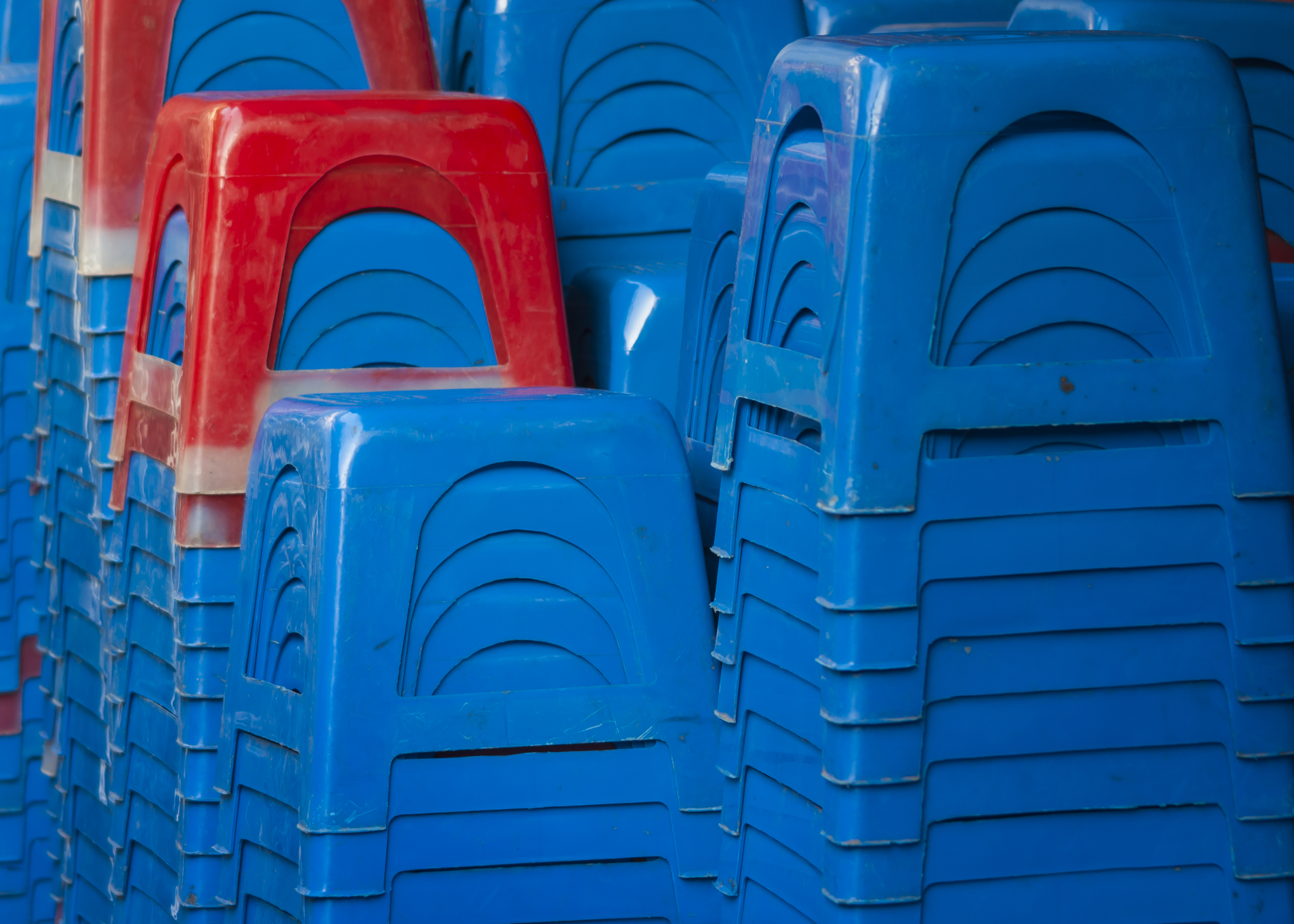
Stools made of HDPE

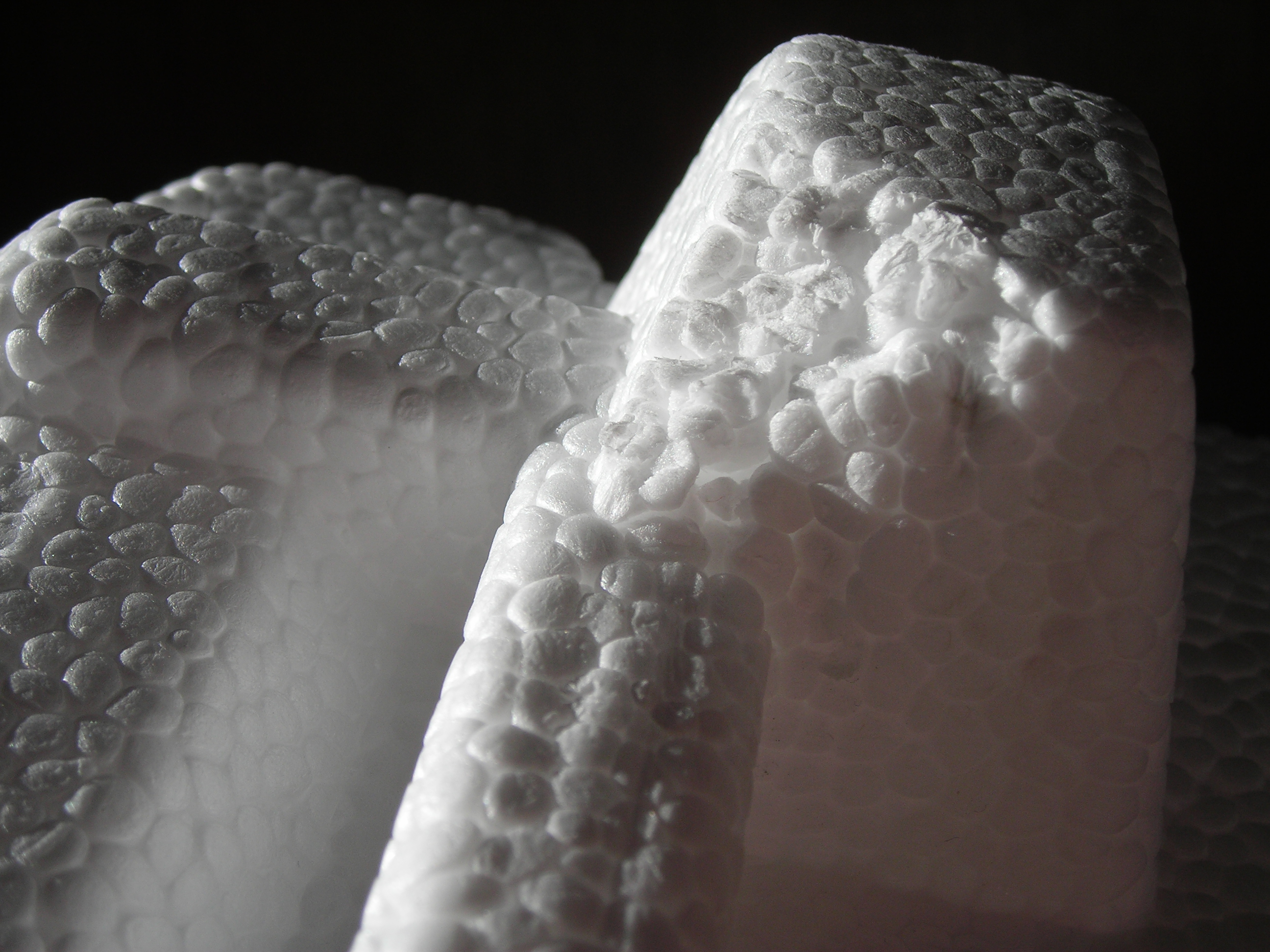
Expanded polystyrene foam ("Thermocol")

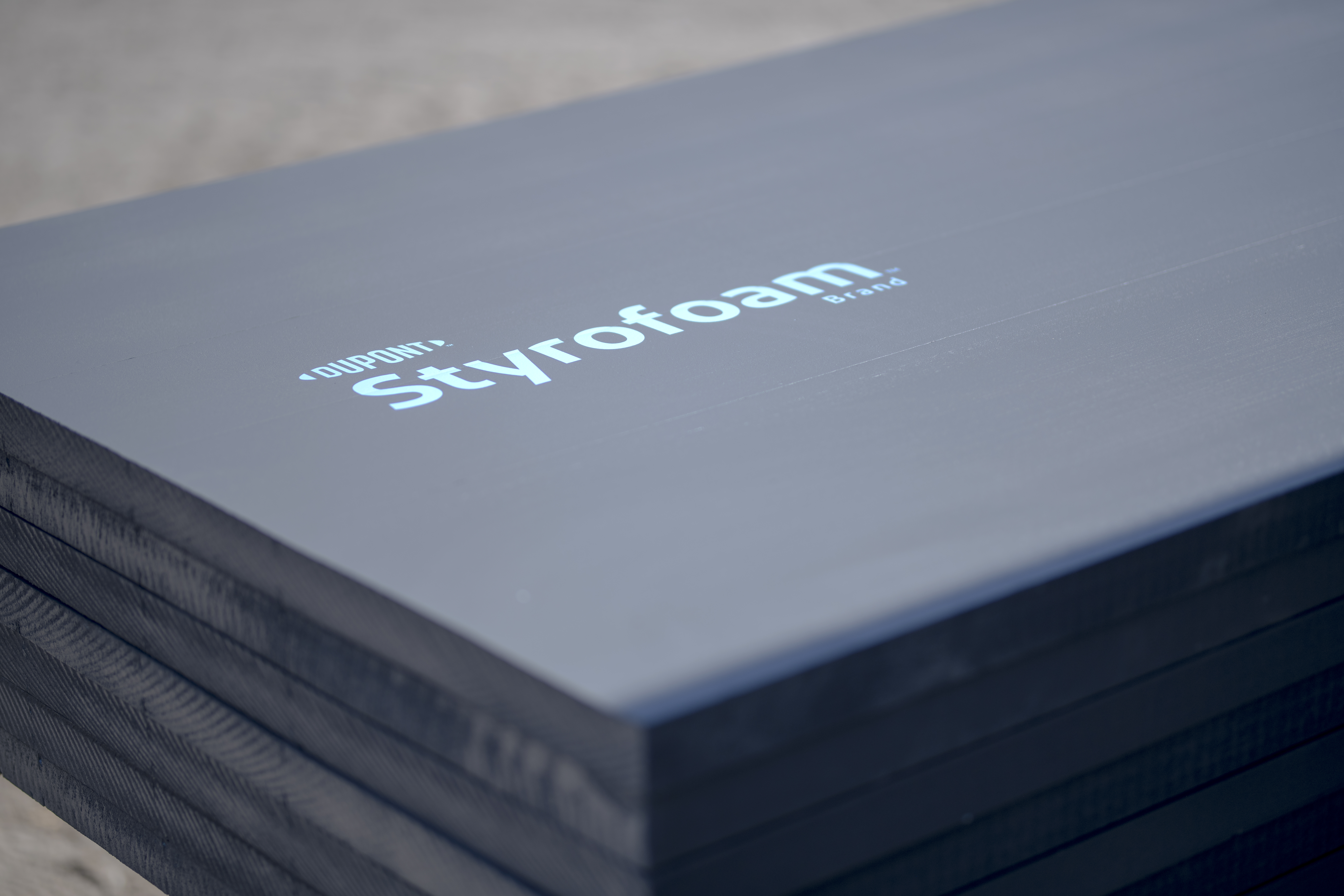
Extruded polystyrene foam ("Styrofoam")

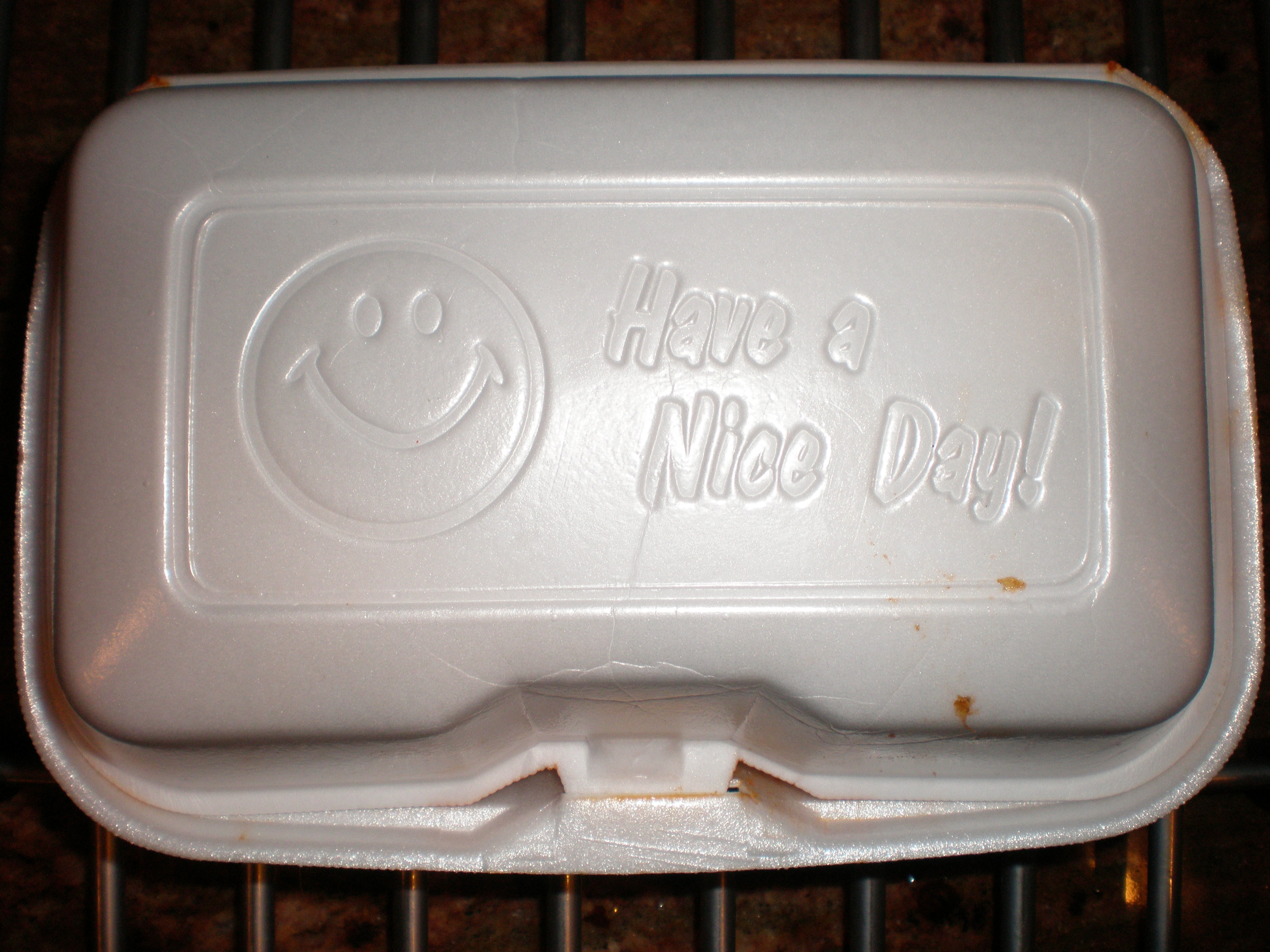
Thermocol take-away food container

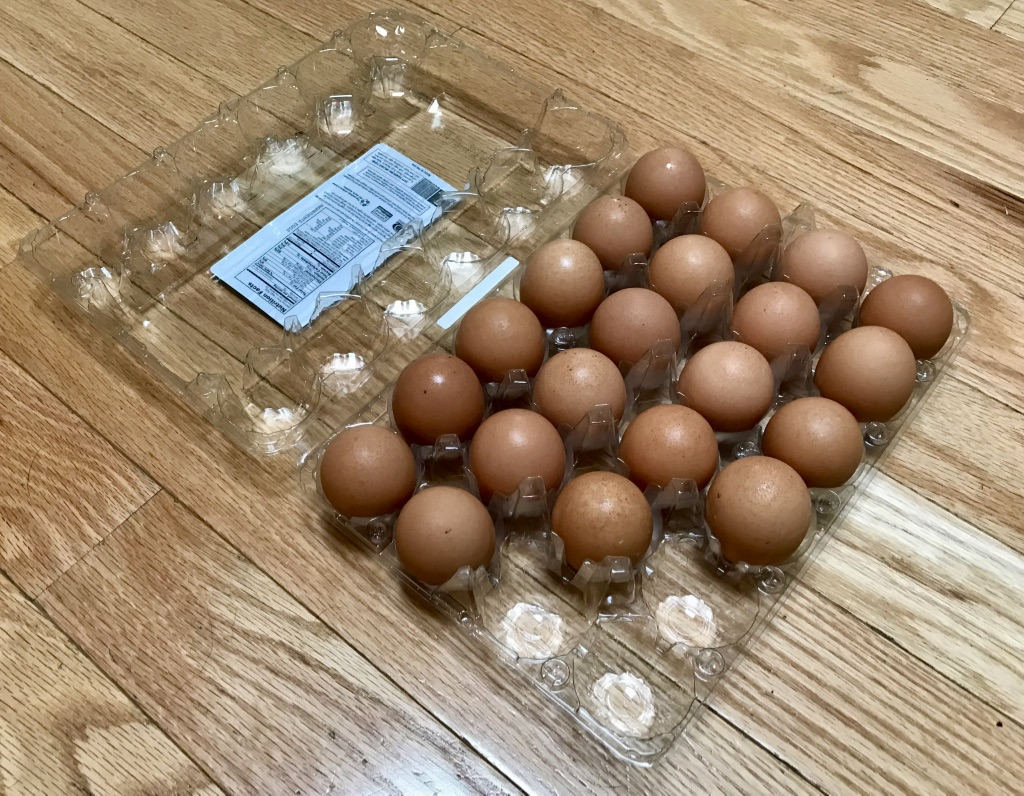
Egg tray made of PETE

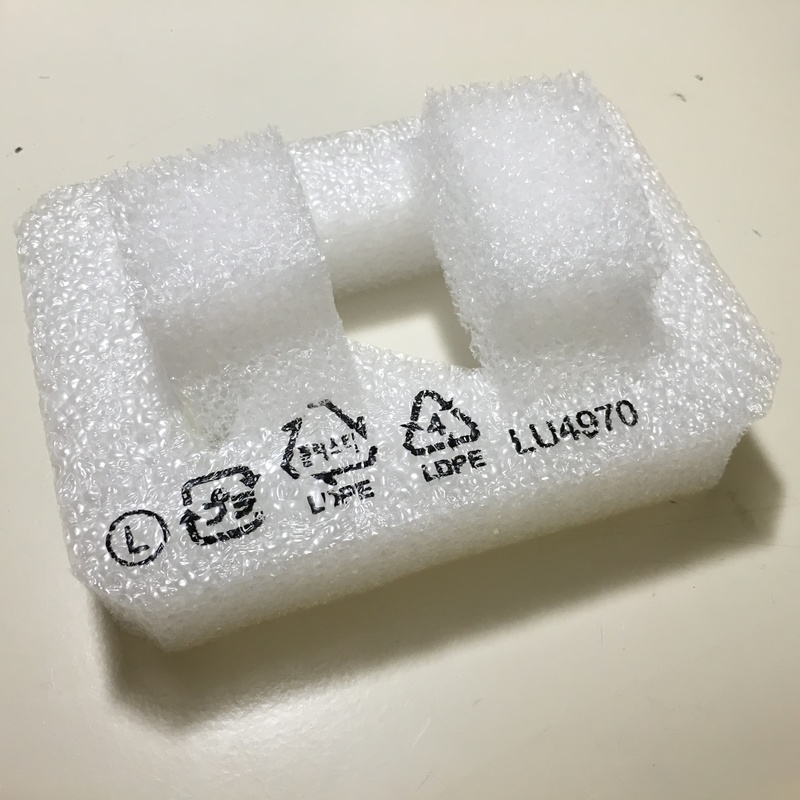
A piece of packaging foam made of LDPE

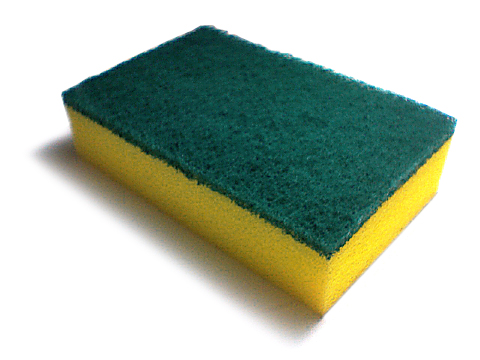
A kitchen sponge made of polyurethane foam

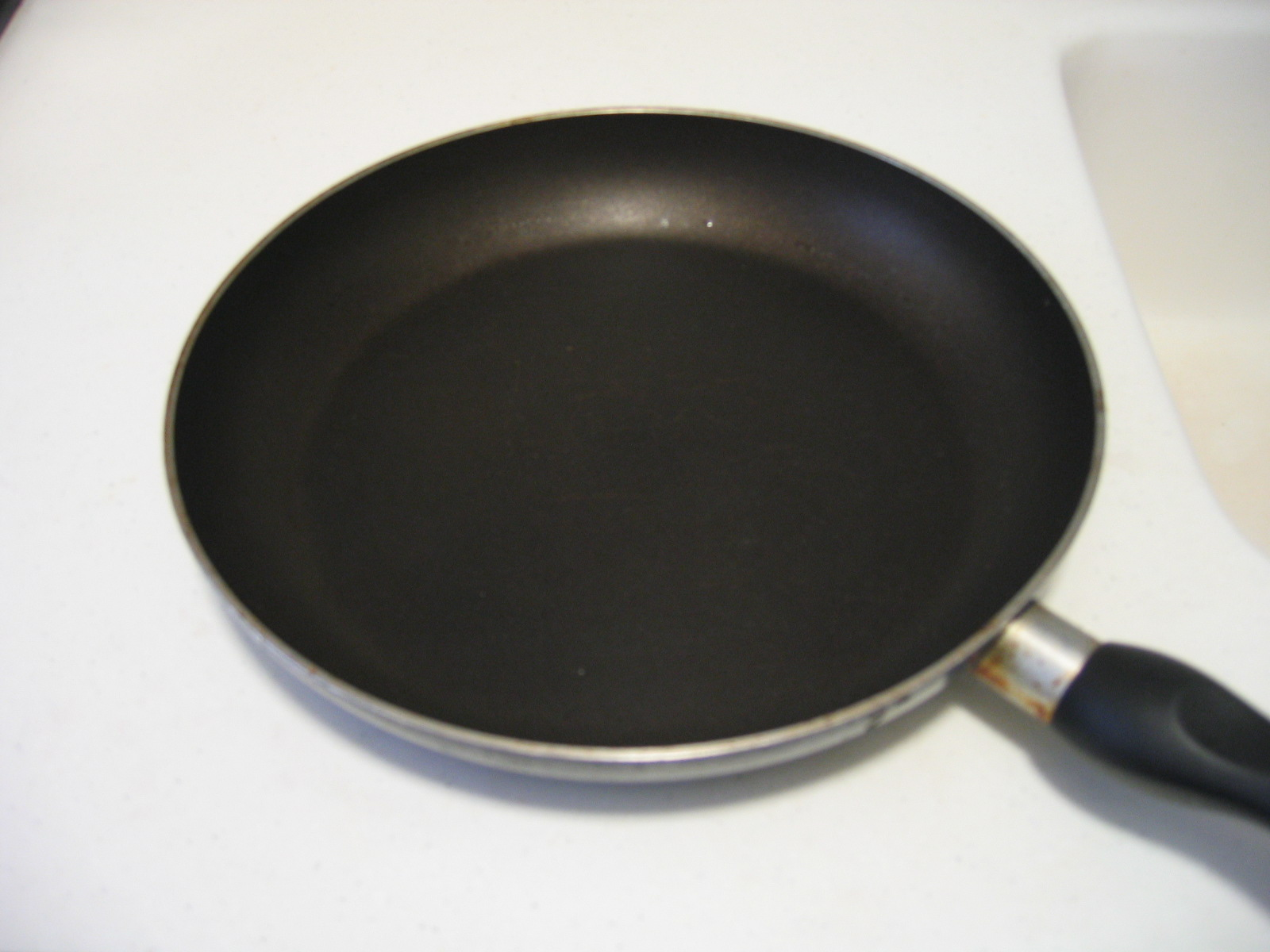
Non-stick cookware with Teflon coating

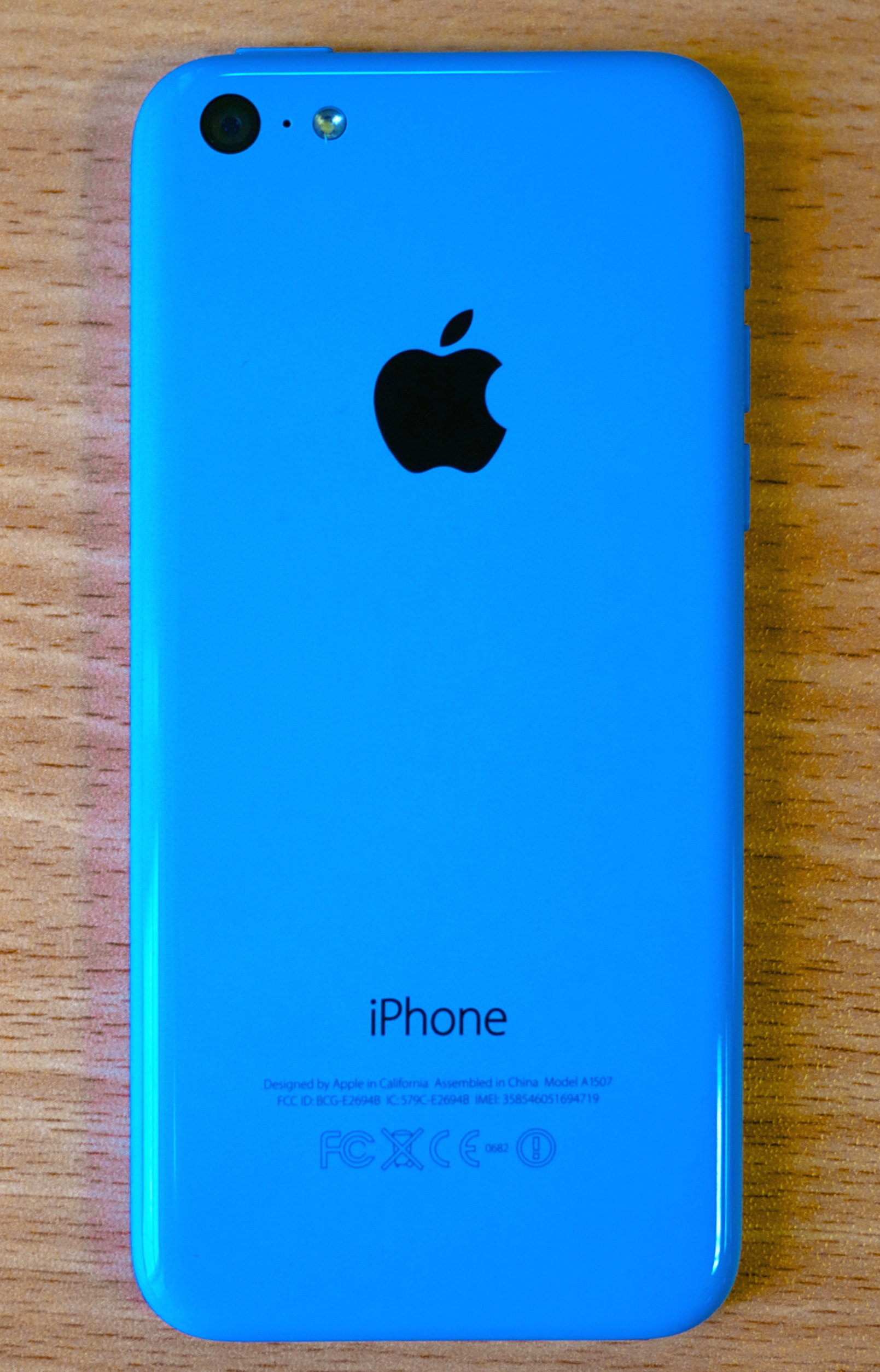
iPhone 5c, a smartphone with a polycarbonate "unibody" shell

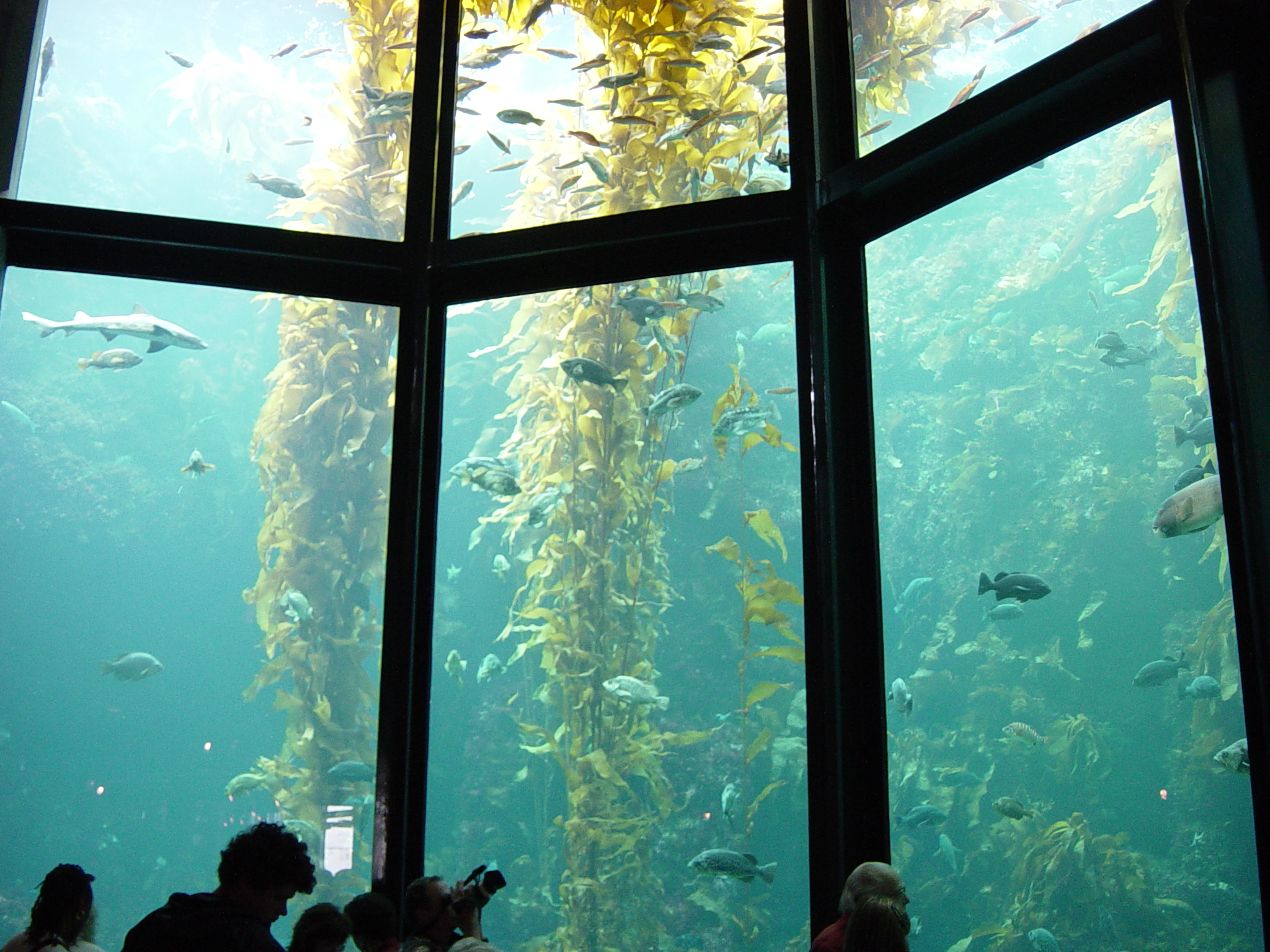
To withstand the extreme water pressure, this 10-meter deep Monterey Bay Aquarium tank has windows made of acrylic glass up to 33 cm thick.

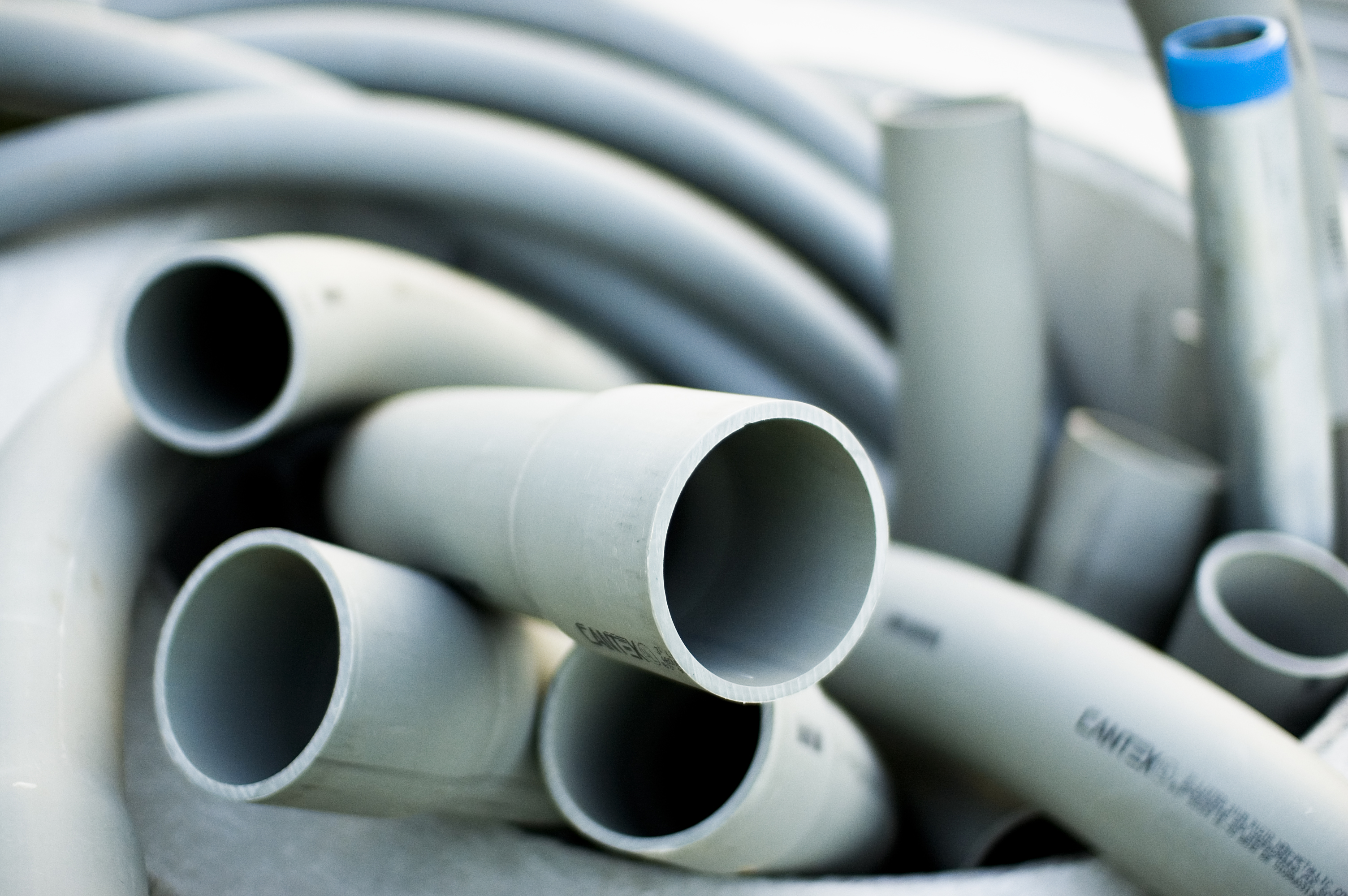
PVC pipes

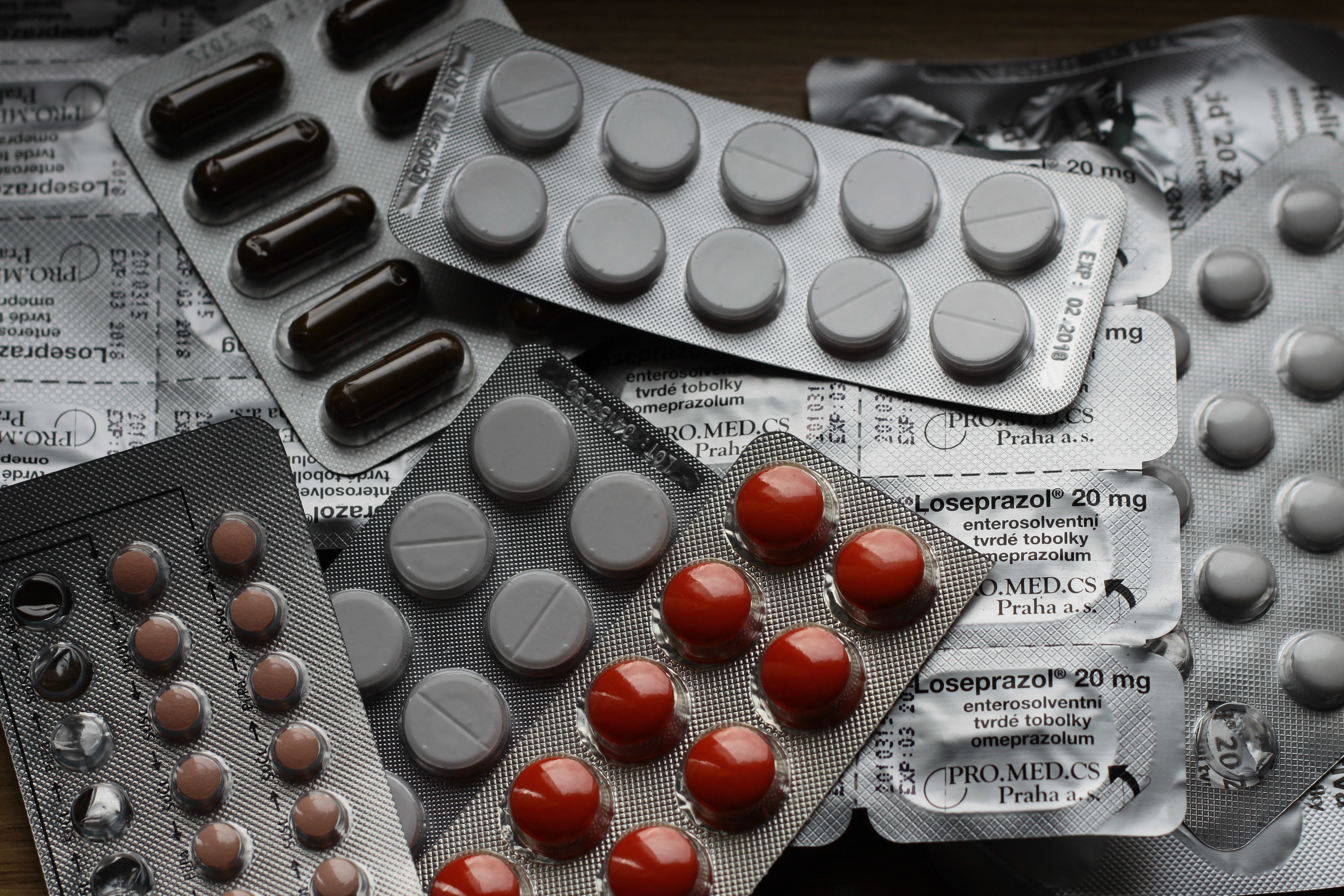
PVC blister pack

== Applications ==
The largest application for plastics is as packaging materials, but they are used in a wide range of other sectors, including: construction (pipes, gutters, door and windows), textiles (stretchable fabrics, fleece), consumer goods (toys, tableware, toothbrushes), transportation (headlights, bumpers, body panels, wing mirrors), electronics (phones, computers, televisions) and as machine parts. In optics, plastics are used to manufacture aspheric lenses.

Primary plastic production by industrial sector 2015 (Million metric tonnes). View chart definition.	Share by industrial sector. View chart definition.

== Additives ==
Additives are chemicals blended into plastics to improved their performance or appearance. Additives are therefore one of the reasons why plastic is used so widely. Plastics are composed of chains of polymers. Many different chemicals are used as plastic additives. A randomly chosen plastic product generally contains around 20 additives. The identities and concentrations of additives are generally not listed on products.

In the EU, more than 400 additives are used in high volumes. In a global market analysis, 5,500 additives were found. At a minimum, all plastic contains some polymer stabilizers which permit them to be melt-processed (molded) without suffering polymer degradation. Additives in polyvinyl chloride (PVC), used widely for sanitary plumbing, can constitute up to 80% of the total volume. Unadulterated plastic (barefoot resin) is rarely sold.

=== Leaching ===
Additives may be weakly bound to the polymers or react in the polymer matrix. Although additives are blended into plastic they remain chemically distinct from it and can gradually leach back out during normal use, when in landfills, or following improper disposal in the environment. Additives may also degrade to form other compounds that could be more benign or more toxic. Plastic fragmentation into microplastics and nanoplastics can allow chemical additives to move in the environment far from the point of use. Once released, some additives and derivatives may persist in the environment and bioaccumulate in organisms. They can have adverse effects on human health and biota. A recent review by the United States Environmental Protection Agency (US EPA) revealed that out of 3,377 chemicals potentially associated with plastic packaging and 906 likely associated with it, 68 were ranked by ECHA as "highest for human health hazards" and 68 as "highest for environmental hazards".

=== Recycling ===
As additives change the properties of plastics they have to be considered during recycling. Presently, almost all recycling is performed by simply remelting and fabricating used plastic into new items. Additives present risks in recycled products due to their difficulty to remove. When plastic products are recycled, it is highly likely that the additives will be integrated into the new products. Plastic waste, even if it is all of the same polymer type, will contain varying types and amounts of additives. Mixing these together can give a material with inconsistent properties, which can be unappealing to industry. For example, mixing different colored plastics with different plastic colorants together can produce a discolored or brown material and for this reason plastic is usually sorted both by polymer type and color prior to recycling.

Lack of transparency and reporting across the value chain often results in lack of knowledge concerning the chemical profile of the final products. For example, products containing brominated flame retardants have been incorporated into new plastic products. Flame retardants are a group of chemicals used in electronic and electrical equipment, textiles, furniture and construction materials which should not be present in food packaging or child care products. A recent study found brominated dioxins as unintentional contaminants in toys made from recycled plastic electronic waste that contained brominated flame retardants. Brominated dioxins have been found to exhibit toxicity similar to that of chlorinated dioxins. They can have negative developmental effects and negative effects on the nervous system and interfere with mechanisms of the endocrine system.

=== Health effects ===
Plastics have proliferated in part because they are relatively benign. They are not acutely toxic, in large part because they are insoluble and or indigestible owing to their large molecular weight. Their degradation products also are rarely toxic. The same cannot be said about some additives, which tend to be lower molecular weight.

Controversies associated with plastics often relate to their additives, some of which are potentially harmful. For example, some flame retardants, such as octabromodiphenyl ether and pentabromodiphenyl ether, are unsuitable for food packaging. Other harmful additives include cadmium, chromium, lead and mercury (regulated under the Minamata Convention on Mercury), which have previously been used in plastic production, are banned in many jurisdictions. However, they are still routinely found in some plastic packaging, including for food.

==== Poor countries ====
Additives can also be problematic if waste is burned, especially when burning is uncontrolled or takes place in low-technology incinerators, as is common in many developing countries. Incomplete combustion can cause emissions of hazardous substances such as acid gases and ash, which can contain persistent organic pollutants (POPs) such as dioxins.

A number of additives identified as hazardous to humans and/or the environment are regulated internationally. The Stockholm Convention on Persistent Organic Pollutants is a global treaty to protect human health and the environment from chemicals that remain intact in the environment for long periods, become widely distributed geographically, accumulate in the fatty tissue of humans and wildlife, and have harmful impacts on human health or on the environment. The use of bisphenol A (BPA) in plastic baby bottles is banned in many parts of the world but is not restricted in some low-income countries.

==== Animals ====
In 2023, plasticosis, a new disease caused by the ingestion of plastic waste, was discovered in seabirds. Birds affected with this disease were found to have scarred and inflamed digestive tracts, which can impair their ability to digest food. "When birds ingest small pieces of plastic, they found, it inflames the digestive tract. Over time, the persistent inflammation causes tissues to become scarred and disfigured, affecting digestion, growth and survival."

=== Types of additive ===
Additive type	Typical concentration when present (%)	Description	Example compounds	Comment	Share of global additive production (by weight)
Plasticizers	10–70	Plastics can be brittle, adding some plasticizer makes them more durable, adding lots makes them flexible	Phthalates are the dominant class, safer alternatives include adipate esters (DEHA, DOA) and citrate esters (ATBC and TEC)	80–90% of world production is used in PVC, much of the rest is used in cellulose acetate. For most products loadings are between 10 and 35%, high loadings are used for plastisols	34%
Flame retardants	1–30	Being petrochemicals, most plastics burn readily, flame retardants can prevent this	Brominated flame retardants, chlorinated paraffins	Non-chlorinated organophosphates are ecologically safer, though often less efficient	13%
Heat stabilizers	0.3-5	Prevents heat related degradation	Traditionally derivatives of lead, cadmium & tin. Safer modern alternatives include barium/zinc mixtures and calcium stearate, along with various synergists	Almost exclusively used in PVC.	5%
Fillers	0–50	Bulking agents. Can change appearance and mechanical properties, can lower price	Calcium carbonate "chalk", talc, glass beads, carbon black. Also reinforcing fillers such as carbon-fiber	Most opaque plastic contains fillers. High levels can also protect against UV rays.	28%
Impact modifiers	10–40	Improved toughness and resistance to damage	Typically some other elastomeric polymer, e.g. rubbers, styrene copolymers	Chlorinated polyethylene is used for PVC	5%
Antioxidants	0.05–3	Protects against degradation during processing	Phenols, phosphite esters, certain thioethers	The most widely used type of additives, all plastics will contain polymer stabilizers of some sort	6%
Colorants	0.001-10	Imparts color	Numerous dyes or pigments		2%
Lubricants	0.1-3	Assist in forming/molding the plastic, includes processing aids (or flow aids), release agents, slip additives	Hazardous PFASs. Paraffin wax, wax esters, metal stearates (i.e. zinc stearate), long-chain fatty acid amides (oleamide, erucamide)	Very common. All examples form a coating between the plastic and machine parts during production. Reduces pressure and power usage in the extruder. Reduces imperfections.	2%
Light stabilizers	0.05–3	Protects against UV damage	HALS, UV blockers and quenchers	Normally only used for items intended for outdoor use	1%
Other		Various	Antimicrobials, antistatics, blowing agents, nucleating agents, clarifying agents		4%

== Health effects ==
Plastics per se have low toxicity due to their insolubility in water and because they have a large molecular weight. They are biochemically inert. Additives in plastic products can be more problematic. For example, plasticizers such as adipates and phthalates are often added to brittle plastics such as PVC to make them pliable. Traces of these compounds can leach out of the product. Owing to concerns regarding the effects of such leachates, the EU has restricted the use of DEHP (di-2-ethylhexyl phthalate) and other phthalates in some applications, and the US has limited the use of DEHP, DPB, BBP, DINP, DIDP, and DnOP in children's toys and child-care articles through the Consumer Product Safety Improvement Act. That using plastic bottles or food packages causes cancer in humans, even if the packaging is microwaved, has not been established in scientific research to date.

Alkylphenols may cause environmental contamination.

While a finished plastic may be non-toxic, the monomers used in the manufacture of its parent polymers may be toxic. In some cases, small amounts of those chemicals can remain trapped in the product unless suitable processing is employed. For example, the World Health Organization's International Agency for Research on Cancer (IARC) has recognized vinyl chloride, the precursor to PVC, as a human carcinogen.

=== Bisphenol A (BPA) ===
Some plastic products degrade to chemicals with estrogenic activity. The primary building block of polycarbonates, bisphenol A (BPA), is an estrogen-like endocrine disruptor that may leach into food. Research in Environmental Health Perspectives finds that BPA leached from the lining of tin cans, dental sealants and polycarbonate bottles can increase the body weight of lab animals' offspring. A more recent animal study suggests that even low-level exposure to BPA results in insulin resistance, which can lead to inflammation and heart disease. As of January 2010, the Los Angeles Times reported that the US Food and Drug Administration (FDA) is spending $30 million to investigate indications of BPA's link to cancer. Bis(2-ethylhexyl) adipate, present in plastic wrap based on PVC, is also of concern, as are the volatile organic compounds present in new car smell. The EU has a permanent ban on the use of phthalates in toys. In 2009, the US government banned certain types of phthalates commonly used in plastic.

== Environmental effects ==
Estimates differ as to the amount of plastic waste produced in the last century. By one estimate, one billion tons of plastic waste have been discarded since the 1950s. Others estimate a cumulative human production of 8.3-billion tons of plastic, of which 6.3-billion tons is waste, with only 9% getting recycled.

It is estimated that this waste is made up of 81% polymer resin, 13% polymer fibers and 32% additives. In 2018 more than 343 million tons of plastic waste were generated, 90% of which was composed of post-consumer plastic waste (industrial, agricultural, commercial and municipal plastic waste). The rest was pre-consumer waste from resin production and manufacturing of plastic products (e.g. materials rejected due to unsuitable color, hardness, or processing characteristics).

The Ocean Conservancy reported that China, Indonesia, Philippines, Thailand, and Vietnam dump more plastic into the sea than all other countries combined. The rivers Yangtze, Indus, Yellow, Hai, Nile, Ganges, Pearl, Amur, Niger, and Mekong "transport 88% to 95% of the global [plastics] load into the sea."

The presence of plastics, particularly microplastics, within the food chain is increasing. In the 1960s microplastics were observed in the guts of seabirds, and since then have been found in increasing concentrations. The long-term effects of plastics in the food chain are poorly understood. In 2009 it was estimated that 10% of modern waste was plastic, although estimates vary according to region. Meanwhile, 50% to 80% of debris in marine areas is plastic. Plastic is often used in agriculture. There is more plastic in the soil than in the oceans. The presence of plastic in the environment hurts ecosystems and human health.

Research on the environmental impacts has typically focused on the disposal phase. However, the production of plastics is also responsible for substantial environmental, health and socioeconomic impacts.

Prior to the Montreal Protocol, CFCs had been commonly used in the manufacture of the plastic polystyrene, the production of which had contributed to depletion of the ozone layer.

Efforts to minimize environmental impact of plastics may include lowering of plastics production and use, waste- and recycling-policies, and the proactive development and deployment of alternatives to plastics such as for sustainable packaging.

=== Microplastics ===
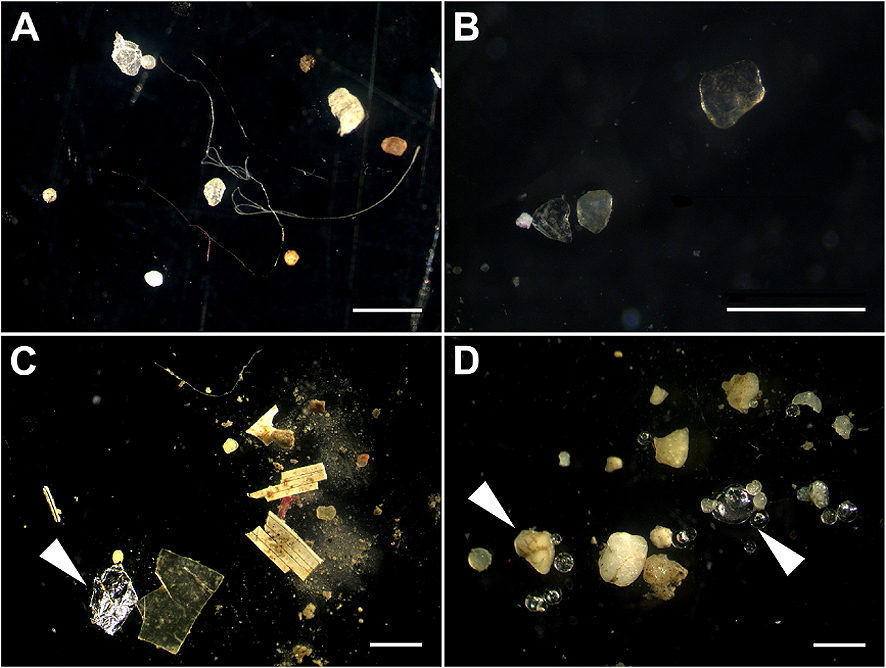
Micro plastics of diverse shapes in sediments from four rivers in Germany—‌white arrowheads indicate aluminium, glass and sand (white bars represent 1 mm for scale)

Photodegraded plastic straw. A light touch breaks the larger straw into microplastics.

Microplastics are "synthetic solid particulate matter or polymeric matrices, with regular or irregular shape and with size ranging from 1 μm to 5 mm, of either primary or secondary manufacturing origin, which are insoluble in water." Microplastics cause pollution by entering natural ecosystems from a variety of sources, including cosmetics, clothing, construction, renovation, food packaging, and industrial processes. However, there are different microplastic remediation strategies that can help mitigate the effects of plastic pollution.

The term microplastics is used to differentiate them from larger, non-microscopic plastic waste. Two classifications of microplastics are currently recognized. Primary microplastics include any plastic fragments or particles that are already 5 mm in size or less before entering the environment. These include microfibers from clothing, microbeads, plastic glitter and plastic pellets (also known as nurdles). Secondary microplastics arise from the degradation (breakdown) of larger plastic products through natural weathering processes after entering the environment. Such sources of secondary microplastics include water and soda bottles, fishing nets, plastic bags, microwave containers, tea bags and tire wear.

Both types are recognized to persist in the environment at high levels, particularly in aquatic and marine ecosystems, where they are considered water pollution. It is estimated that by 2050, the weight of microplastics in the sea will exceed that of the fish.

Microplastics also accumulate in the air and terrestrial ecosystems. Airborne microplastics have been detected in the atmosphere, as well as indoors and outdoors.

Because some plastics degrade slowly (often over hundreds to thousands of years), microplastics have a high probability of ingestion, incorporation into, and accumulation in the bodies and tissues of many organisms. In terrestrial ecosystems, microplastics have been demonstrated to lower the viability of soil ecosystems.

Microplastics are likely to degrade into smaller nanoplastics through chemical weathering processes, mechanical breakdown, and even through the digestive processes of animals. Nanoplastics are a subset of microplastics and are smaller than 1 μm (1 micrometer, or 1000 nm). Nanoplastics cannot be seen by the human eye.

=== Decomposition of plastics ===
Plastics degrade by a variety of processes, the most significant of which are hydrolysis and photo-oxidation. Chemical structure determines the fate of a polymers. Hence, decomposition pathways can be evaluated according to polymer types of major polymers. They are by volume: polyolefins (polyethyene, polypropylene, polystyrene), polyvinyl chloride, polyethylene terephthalate (PET). In general the degradability of a polymer correlates with the presence of functional groups (esters, amides). Polyolefins, which lack functional groups, degrade very slowly, especially polyethylene. In the case of polyethylene, degradation is attributed to reactions of defects within the polymer chain, such as alkene groups. PET, a polyester, degrades relatively quickly by multiple pathways, including ester hydrolysis and photooxidation. Whereas the other main polymers are stable to > 400 °C, PVC degrades at <300 °C. The process entails loss of hydrogen chloride (HCl). The evolved HCl catalyzes degradation of the PVC, thus much effort is devoted to capturing the HCl by mixing the PVC with additives.

Microbial species capable of degrading plastics are known, but remain curiosities.

Phenol-formaldehyde, commonly known as Bakelite, is degraded by the white rot fungus P. chrysosporium.

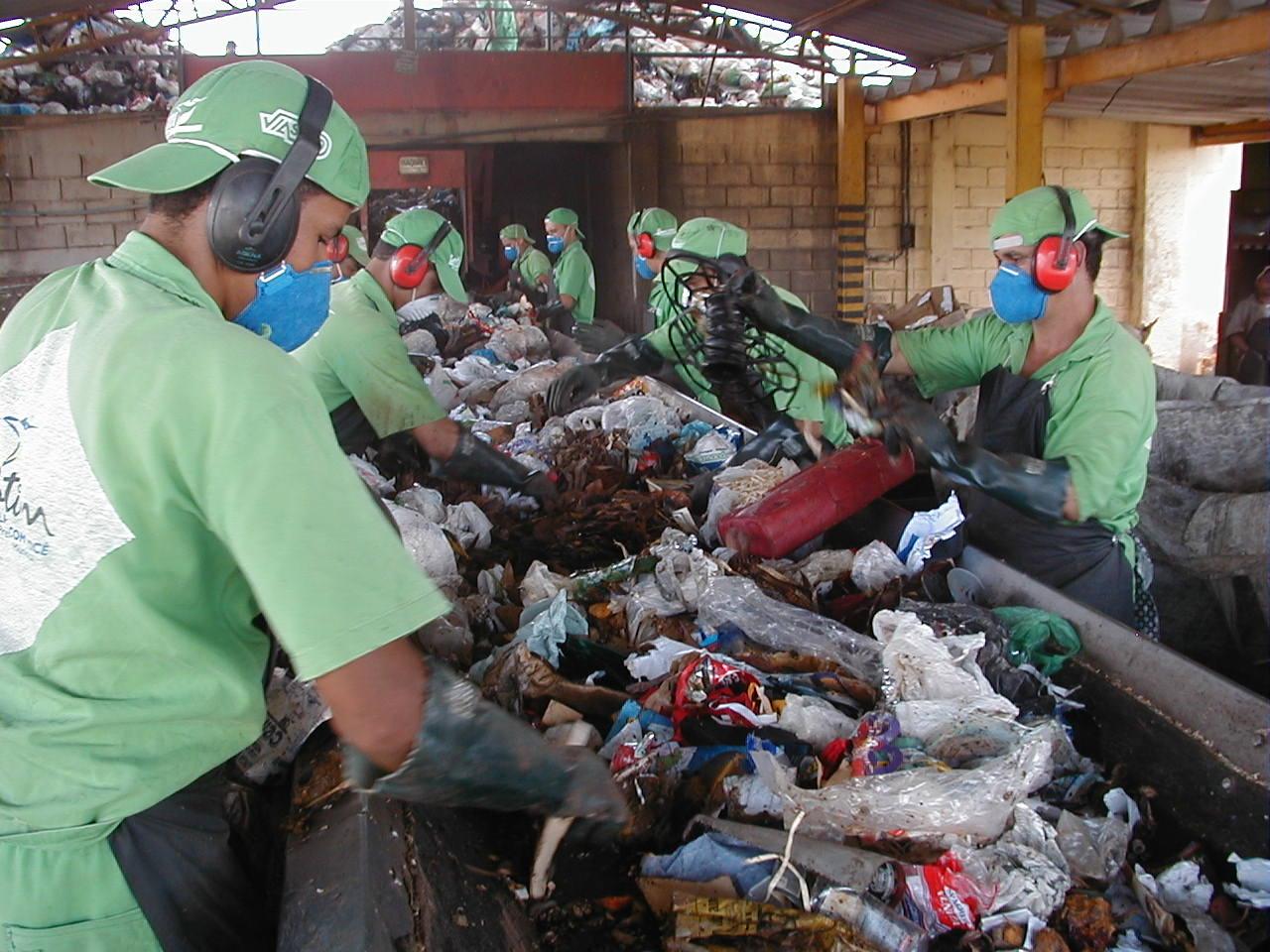
Manual material triage for recycling

=== Recycling ===
Plastic recycling
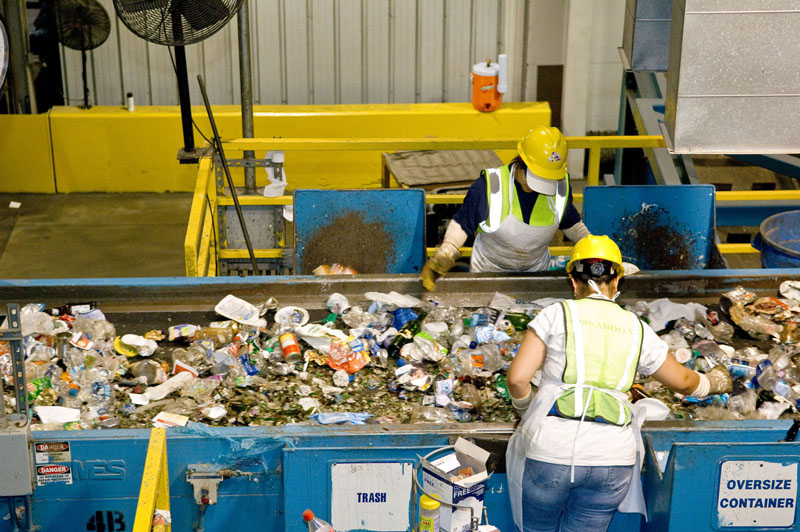
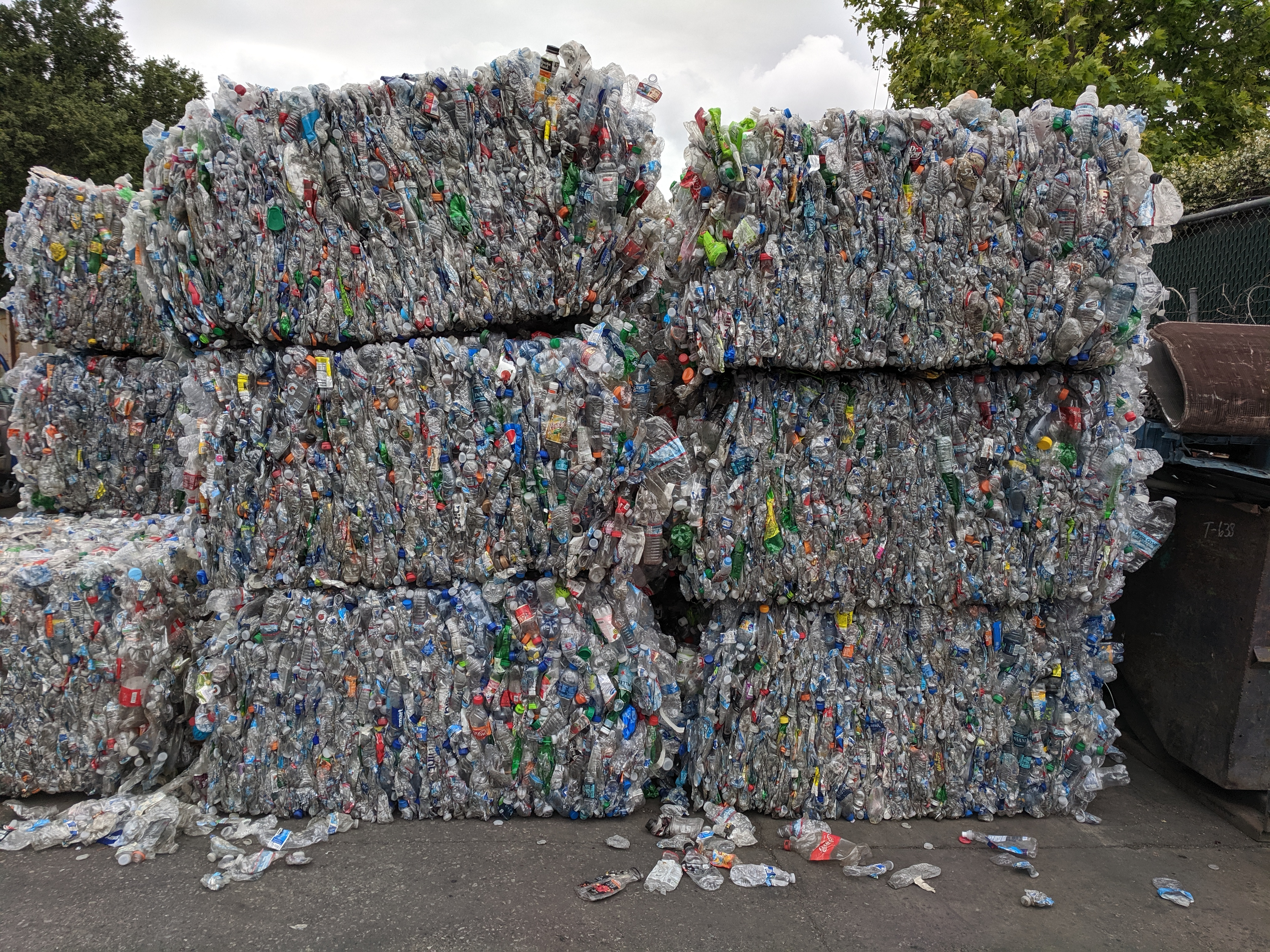
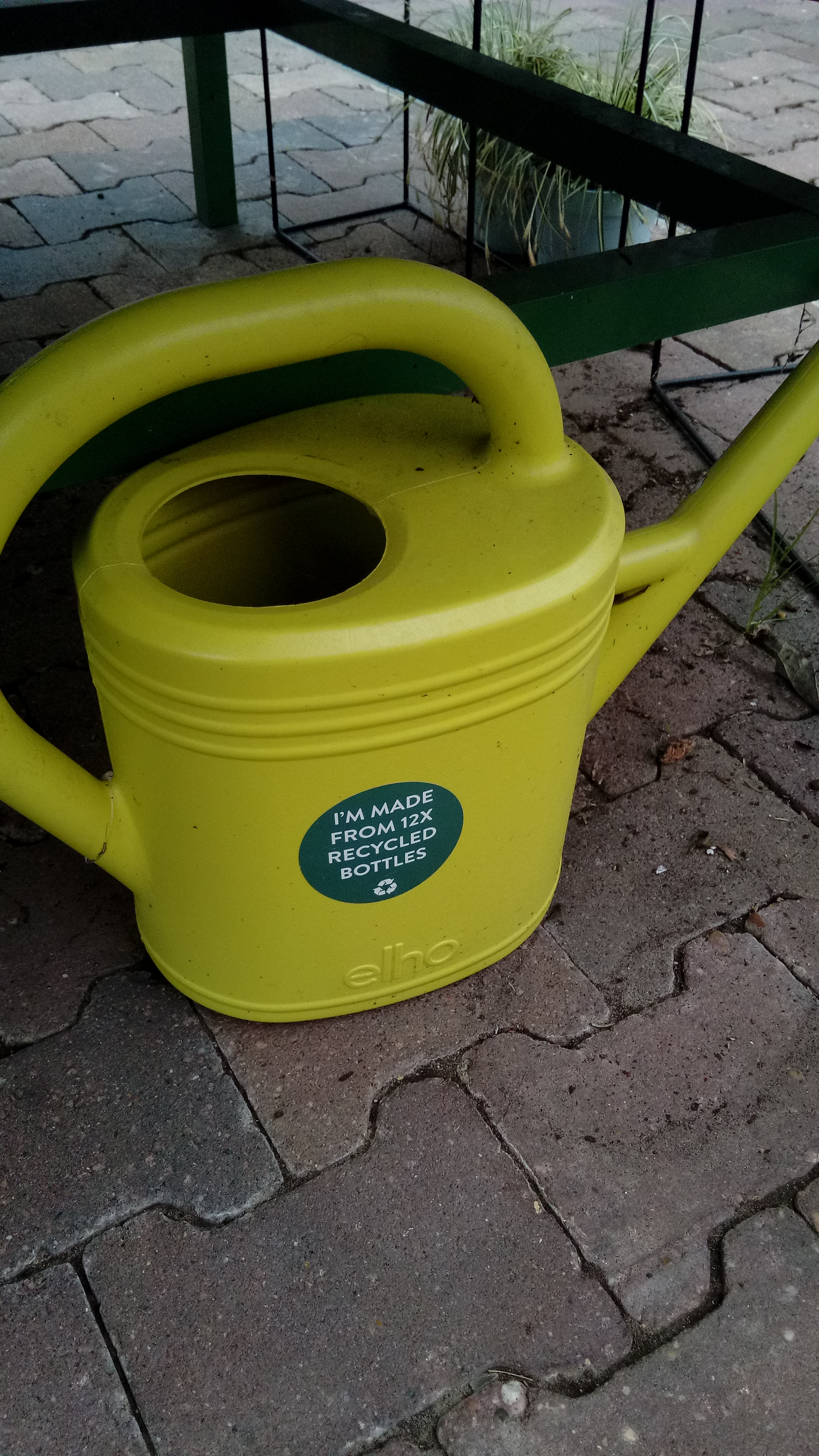
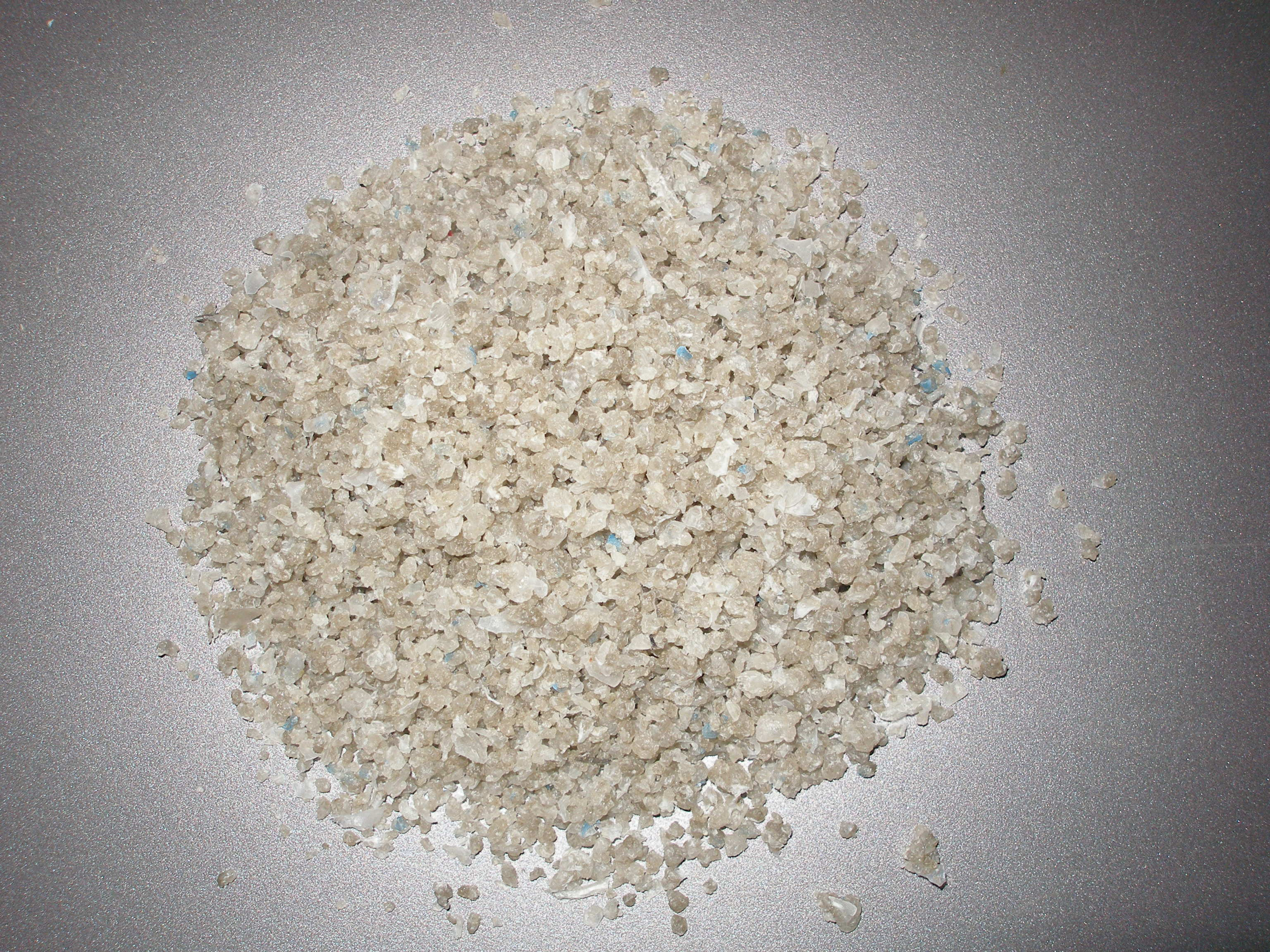
Clockwise from top left:
- Sorting plastic waste at a single-stream recycling centre
- Baled colour-sorted used bottles
- Recovered HDPE ready for recycling
- A watering can made from recycled bottles

Plastic recycling is the processing of plastic waste into other products. Recycling can reduce dependence on landfills, conserve resources and protect the environment from plastic pollution and greenhouse gas emissions. Recycling rates lag behind those of other recoverable materials, such as aluminium, glass and paper. From the start of plastic production through to 2015, the world produced around 6.3 billion tonnes of plastic waste, only 9% of which has been recycled and only ~1% has been recycled more than once. Of the remaining waste, 12% was incinerated and 79% was either sent to landfills or released into the environment as pollution.

Almost all plastic is non-biodegradable and without recycling, spreads across the environment where it causes plastic pollution. For example, as of 2015, approximately 8 million tonnes of waste plastic enters the oceans annually, damaging oceanic ecosystems and forming ocean garbage patches.

Most plastic recycling is currently mechanical and involves the melting and reforming of plastic into other items. This can cause polymer degradation at the molecular level, and requires that waste be sorted by colour and polymer type before processing, which is often complicated and expensive. Errors can lead to material with inconsistent properties, rendering it unappealing to industry. Though filtration in mechanical recycling reduces microplastic release, even the most efficient filtration systems cannot prevent the release of microplastics into wastewater.

In feedstock recycling, waste plastic is converted into its starting chemicals, which can then become fresh plastic. This involves higher energy and capital costs. Alternatively, plastic can be burned in place of fossil fuels in energy recovery facilities, or biochemically converted into other useful chemicals for industry. In some countries, burning is the dominant form of plastic waste disposal, particularly where landfill diversion policies are in place.

Plastic recycling is low in the waste hierarchy; waste reduction and plastic reuse are more favourable and long-term solutions for environmental sustainability. Recycling of plastics has been encouraged since the early 1970s, however, due to economic and technical challenges, such recycling did not impact the management of plastic waste to any significant extent until the late 1980s.

==== Pyrolysis ====
By heating to above 500 °C (932 °F) in the absence of oxygen (pyrolysis), plastics can be broken down into simpler hydrocarbons, which can be used as feedstocks for the fabrication of new plastics. These hydrocarbons can also be used as fuels.

=== Greenhouse gas emissions ===
According to the Organisation for Economic Co-operation and Development, plastic contributed greenhouse gases in the equivalent of 1.8 billion tons of carbon dioxide (CO_{2}) to the atmosphere in 2019, 3.4% of global emissions. They say that by 2060, plastic could emit 4.3 billion tons of greenhouse gas a year. The effect of plastics on global warming is mixed. Plastics are generally made from fossil gas or petroleum; thus, the production of plastics creates further fugitive emissions of methane when the fossil gas or petroleum is produced. Additionally, much of the energy used in plastic production is not sustainable energy; for example, high temperature from burning fossil gas. However, plastics can also limit methane emissions; for example, packaging to reduce food waste.

A study from 2024 found that compared to glass and aluminum, plastic may actually have less of a negative effect on the environment and therefore might be the best option for must food packaging and other common uses. The study found that, "replacing plastics with alternatives is worse for greenhouse gas emissions in most cases." and that the study involving European researchers found, "15 of the 16 applications a plastic product incurs fewer greenhouse gas emissions than their alternatives."

==== Reducing plastic production as a climate solution ====
In 2025, for the first time in history almost every country discussed not about just recycling but about reducing plastic production. This can be considered as indispensable part of the solution to the problem of climate change because plastic is responsible for 3-5% of emissions according to the United Nations and the US Lawrence Berkeley National Laboratory and this can triple by 2060 One of the reasons is that burning of plastics releases black carbon, which has a global warming potential of up to 5,000 times greater than CO2.

=== Production of plastics ===
Production of plastics from crude oil requires 7.9 to 13.7 kWh/lb (taking into account the average efficiency of US utility stations of 35%). Producing silicon and semiconductors for modern electronic equipment is even more energy consuming: 29.2 to 29.8 kWh/lb for silicon, and about 381 kWh/lb for semiconductors. This is much higher than the energy needed to produce many other materials. For example, to produce iron (from iron ore) requires 2.5-3.2 kWh/lb of energy; glass (from sand, etc.) 2.3–4.4 kWh/lb; steel (from iron) 2.5–6.4 kWh/lb; and paper (from timber) 3.2–6.4 kWh/lb.

=== Incineration of plastics ===
Quickly burning plastics at very high temperatures breaks down many toxic components, such as dioxins and furans. This approach is widely used in municipal solid waste incineration. Municipal solid waste incinerators also normally treat the flue gas to decrease pollutants further, which is needed because uncontrolled incineration of plastic produces carcinogenic polychlorinated dibenzo-p-dioxins. Open-air burning of plastic occurs at lower temperatures and normally releases such toxic fumes.

In the European Union, municipal waste incineration is regulated by the Industrial Emissions Directive, which stipulates a minimum temperature of 850 °C for at least two seconds.

=== Facilitation of natural degradation ===
The bacterium Blaptica dubia is claimed to help degradation of commercial polysterene. This biodegradation seems to occur in some plastic degrading bacteria inhabiting the gut of cockroaches. The biodegradation products have been found in their feces too. Research has been performed evaluating the feasibility of including bacteria in plastic or using it to degrade plastic at scale.

== History ==
The development of plastics has evolved from the use of naturally plastic materials (e.g., gums and shellac) to the use of the chemical modification of those materials (e.g., natural rubber, cellulose, collagen, and milk proteins), and finally to completely synthetic plastics (e.g., Bakelite, epoxy, and PVC). Early plastics were bio-derived materials such as egg and blood proteins, which are organic polymers. In around 1600 BC, Mesoamericans used natural rubber for balls, bands, and figurines. Treated cattle horns were used as windows for lanterns in the Middle Ages. Materials that mimicked the properties of horns were developed by treating milk proteins with lye. In the nineteenth century, as chemistry developed during the Industrial Revolution, many materials were reported. The development of plastics accelerated with Charles Goodyear's 1839 discovery of vulcanization to harden natural rubber.

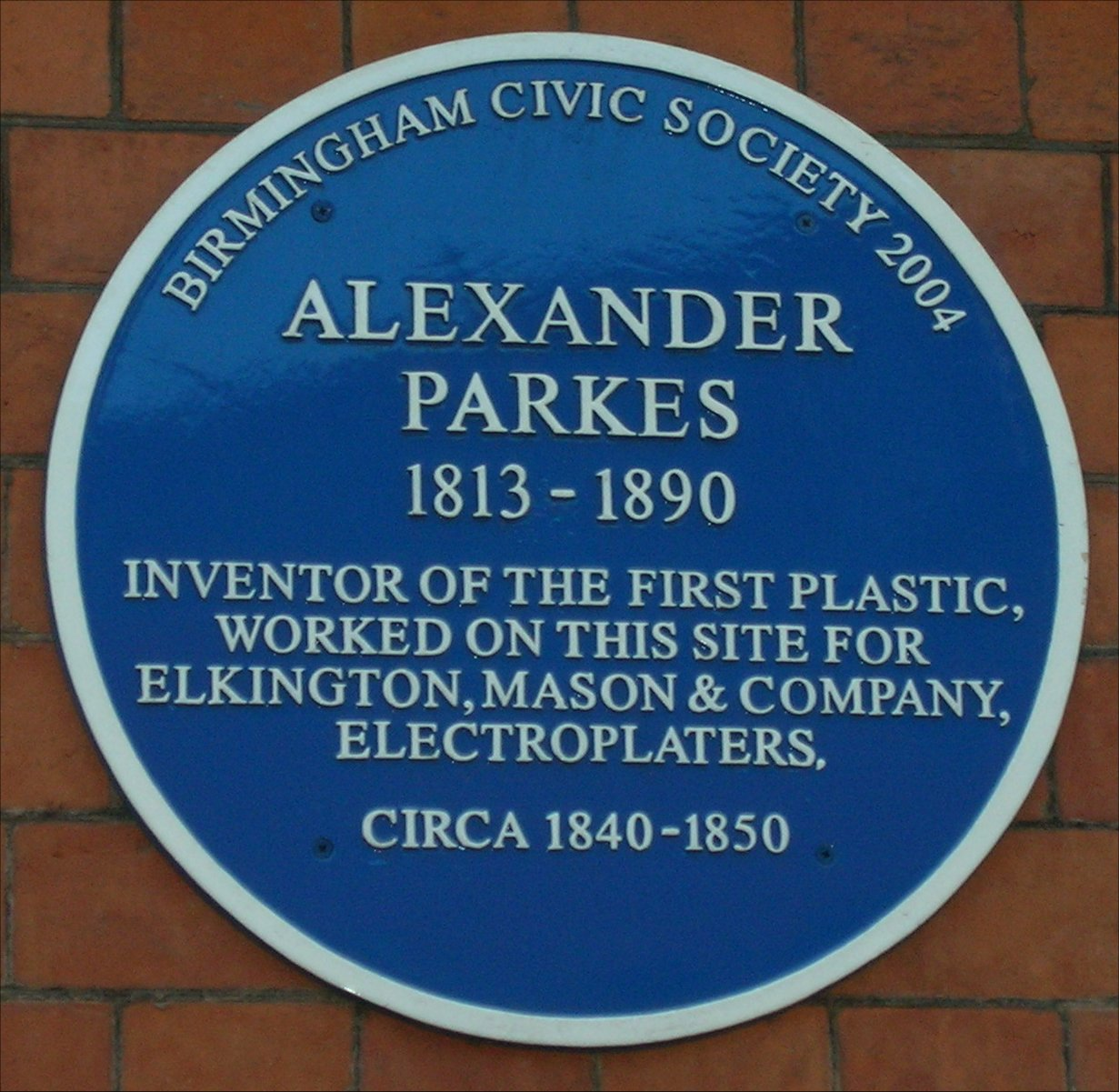
Plaque commemorating Parkes at the Birmingham Science Museum

Parkesine, invented by Alexander Parkes in 1855 and patented the following year, is considered the first man-made plastic. It was manufactured from cellulose (the major component of plant cell walls) treated with nitric acid as a solvent. The output of the process (commonly known as cellulose nitrate or pyroxilin) could be dissolved in alcohol and hardened into a transparent and elastic material that could be molded when heated. By incorporating pigments into the product, it could be made to resemble ivory. Parkesine was unveiled at the 1862 International Exhibition in London and garnered for Parkes the bronze medal.

In 1893, French chemist Auguste Trillat discovered the means to insolubilize casein (milk proteins) by immersion in formaldehyde, producing material marketed as galalith. In 1897, mass-printing press owner Wilhelm Krische of Hanover, Germany, was commissioned to develop an alternative to blackboards. The resultant horn-like plastic made from casein was developed in cooperation with the Austrian chemist (Friedrich) Adolph Spitteler (1846–1940). Although unsuitable for the intended purpose, other uses would be discovered.

The world's first fully synthetic plastic was Bakelite, invented in New York in 1907 by Leo Baekeland, who coined the term plastics. Many chemists have contributed to the materials science of plastics, including Nobel laureate Hermann Staudinger, who has been called "the father of polymer chemistry", and Herman Mark, known as "the father of polymer physics". After World War I, improvements in chemistry led to an explosion of new forms of plastics, with mass production beginning in the 1940s and 1950s. Among the earliest examples in the wave of new polymers were polystyrene (first produced by BASF in the 1930s) and polyvinyl chloride (first created in 1872 but commercially produced in the late 1920s). In 1923, Durite Plastics, Inc., was the first manufacturer of phenol-furfural resins. In 1933, polyethylene was discovered by Imperial Chemical Industries (ICI) researchers Reginald Gibson and Eric Fawcett.

The discovery of polyethylene terephthalate (PETE) is credited to employees of the Calico Printers' Association in the UK in 1941; it was licensed to DuPont for the US and ICI otherwise, and as one of the few plastics appropriate as a replacement for glass in many circumstances, resulting in widespread use for bottles in Europe. In 1954 polypropylene was discovered by Giulio Natta and began to be manufactured in 1957. Also in 1954 expanded polystyrene (used for building insulation, packaging, and cups) was invented by Dow Chemical. Since the 1960s, plastic production has surged with the advent of polycarbonate and HDPE, widely used in various products. In the 1980s and 1990s, plastic recycling and the development of biodegradable plastics began to flourish to mitigate environmental impacts. From 2000 to the present, bioplastics from renewable sources and awareness of microplastics have spurred extensive research and policies to control plastic pollution.

== Policy ==
Work is currently underway to develop a global treaty on plastic pollution. On March 2, 2022, UN Member States voted at the resumed fifth UN Environment Assembly (UNEA-5.2) to establish an Intergovernmental Negotiating Committee (INC) with the mandate of advancing a legally-binding international agreement on plastics. The resolution is entitled "End plastic pollution: Towards an international legally binding instrument." The mandate specifies that the INC must begin its work by the end of 2022 with the goal of "completing a draft global legally binding agreement by the end of 2024."

== See also ==
- American Recyclable Plastic Bag Alliance – Manufacturers and recyclers' lobby group
- Corn construction – Use of corn (maize) in construction
- Light activated resin – Resin that cures when exposed to light of appropriate wavelengths
- Organic light emitting diode – Diode that emits light from an organic compound
- Plastic film – Thin continuous polymeric material
- Plastic pollution – Accumulation of plastic in natural ecosystems
- Plastics engineering – Engineering field studying polymer materials
- Plasticulture – Use of plastic materials in agriculture
- Plastisphere – Plastic debris suspended in water and organisms which live in it
- Refill (scheme) – British environmental campaign
- Roll-to-roll processing – Electronic device manufacturing process
- Self-healing plastic – Substances that can repair themselves
- Thermal cleaning – Industrial cleaning techniques
- Thermoforming – Manufacturing process for molding plastic with heat
- Timeline of materials technology

Plastic in the sense of malleable

- Plastic arts – Art that involves physical manipulation
- Plastic ratio – Number, approximately 1.32472

== Sources ==
- This article incorporates text from a free content work. Licensed under Cc BY-SA 3.0 IGO (license statement/permission). Text taken from Drowning in Plastics – Marine Litter and Plastic Waste Vital Graphics, United Nations Environment Programme.
