= Acetyl trialkyl citrate =

Family of organic compounds

Acetyl tributylcitrate (ATBC) is a common example of an acetyl trialkyl citrate

Acetyl trialkyl citrates are a family of organic compounds derived from citric acid, consisting of acetylated citrate triesters. These compounds are used as plasticisers in cosmetics such as eyeliner and nail polish. The compounds have a good safety profile and are expected to be biodegradable via hydrolysis of their ester bonds.

The most common acetyl trialkyl citrate is acetyl tributyl citrate (ATBC), but the triethyl derivative is also used in some products. The trihexyl and tri(2-ethylhexyl) derivatives have been studied for human use but were not listed in any products as of 2019.

== Preparation ==
Acetyl trialkyl citrates may be prepared by esterification of citric acid with the appropriate alcohol, such as butanol for ATBC, followed by acetylation of the hydroxyl group of the citrate ester. Acetic anhydride is a suitable acetylating agent.
