= Acetyl tributyl citrate =

Names
- Preferred IUPAC name Tributyl 2-(acetyloxy)propane-1,2,3-tricarboxylate

Identifiers
CAS Number	77-90-7
3D model (JSmol)	Interactive image
ChemSpider	6259
ECHA InfoCard	100.000.971
PubChem CID	6505
UNII	0ZBX0N59RZ
CompTox Dashboard (EPA)	DTXSID2026446
- InChI: InChI=1S/C20H34O8/c1-5-8-11-25-17(22)14-20(28-16(4)21,19(24)27-13-10-7-3)15-18(23)26-12-9-6-2/h5-15H2,1-4H3; InChI=1/C20H34O8/c1-5-8-11-25-17(22)14-20(28-16(4)21,19(24)27-13-10-7-3)15-18(23)26-12-9-6-2/h5-15H2,1-4H3 Key: QZCLKYGREBVARF-UHFFFAOYAE
- SMILES: CCCCOC(=O)CC(CC(=O)OCCCC)(C(=O)OCCCC)OC(=O)C

Properties
Chemical formula	C_{20}H_{34}O_{8}
Molar mass	402.484 g·mol^{−1}
Appearance	Colorless liquid
Density	1.046 g/cm^{3}
Melting point	−80 °C (−112 °F; 193 K)
Boiling point	172 to 174 °C (342 to 345 °F; 445 to 447 K) 1 mm Hg
Solubility in water	0.02 g/L (20 °C)
- Except where otherwise noted, data are given for materials in their standard state (at 25 °C [77 °F], 100 kPa). Infobox references

Acetyl tributyl citrate (ATBC) is an organic compound that is used as a plasticizer. As such, it is a potential replacement of DEHP and DINP. It is a colorless liquid that is soluble in organic solvents. As of 2019, it was the most widely used acetyl trialkyl citrate in cosmetics.

== Preparation ==
It is prepared by acetylation of tributyl citrate.
