= Museum of Concrete =

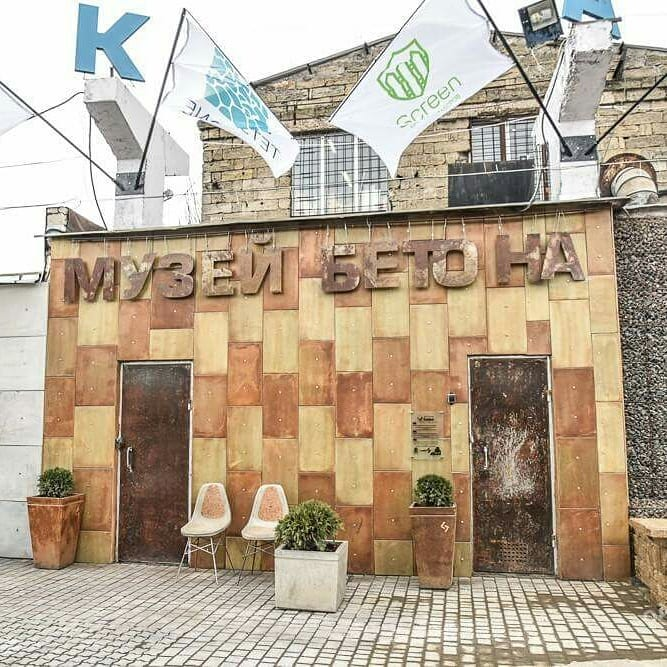
Main entrance

The Museum of Concrete is the first museum in Ukraine dedicated to concrete. The museum is in Odesa on the site of an enterprise that produces building materials. The opening of the museum was held on December 5, 2017. At the time of the opening, two thematic halls were organized. Since January 2018, two rooms have been added. As of May 2018, the museum collection numbered about 2500 exhibits, which are associated with concrete and the technology of its production.

== Decor ==
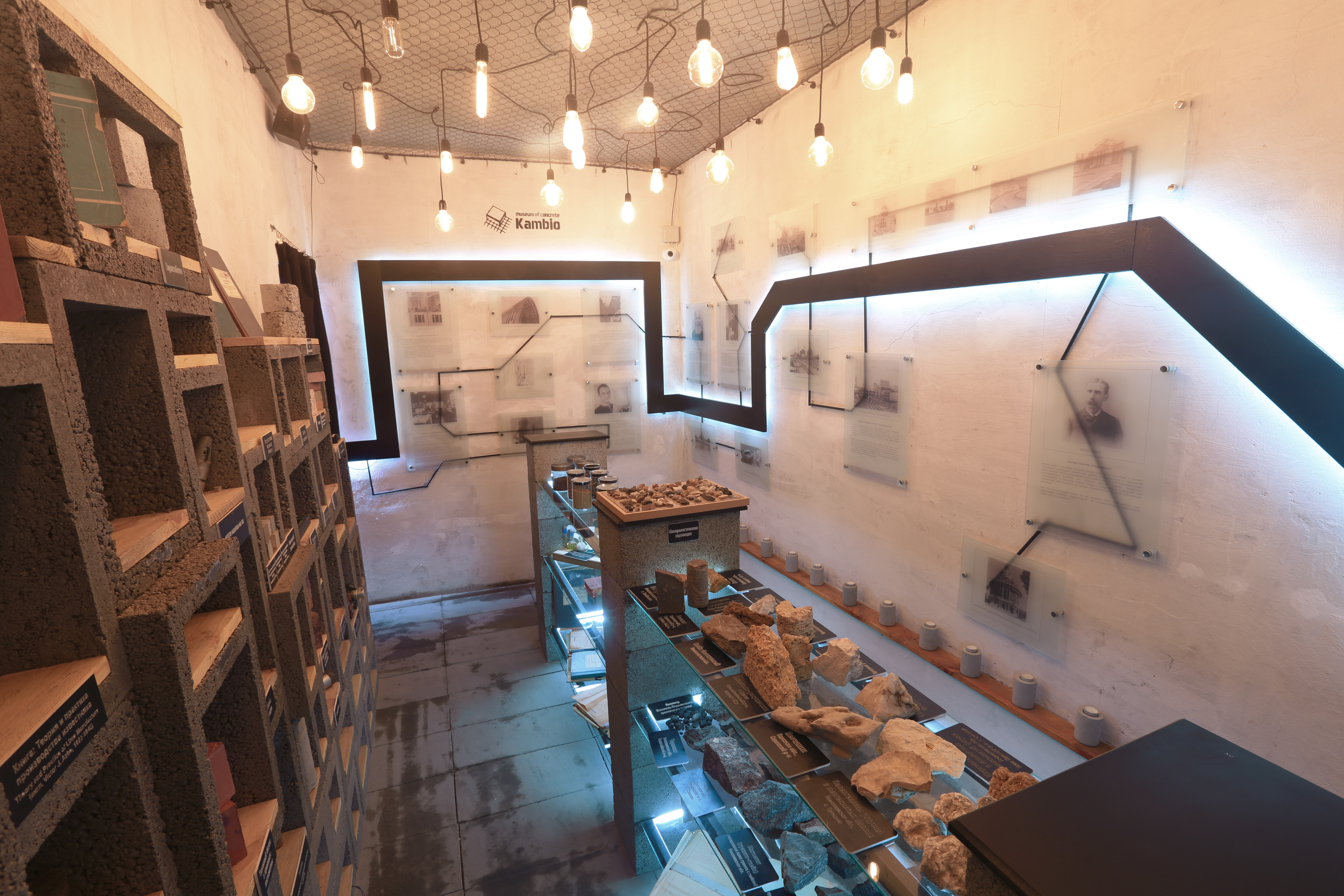
First hall

The first place is occupied by an exposition about the history of the appearance of concrete and its development as a building material from Ancient Rome to fiberglass. Separately presented area a wide range of reagents used in the modern production of concrete products, such as hydrophobicity additives, and plasticizers.

The second hall recreates the atmosphere of the Soviet era and demonstrates the working conditions of the engineer of an industrial enterprise for the production of reinforced concrete. In the hall there is also a technical library on construction topics and reinforced concrete products.

== Interactive hall ==
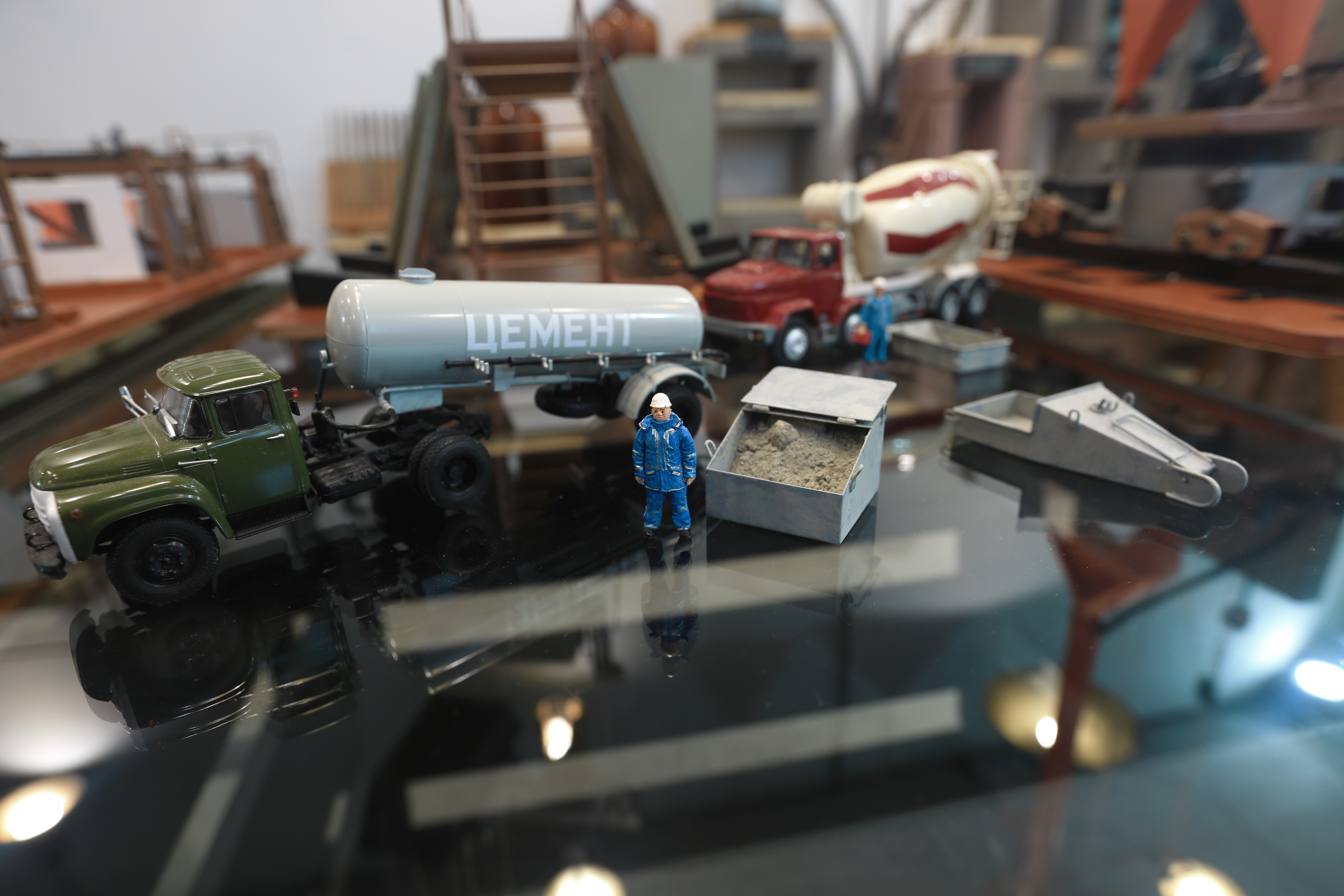
Exhibits

The hall contains interactive stands connected, for example, with the production and storage of reinforced concrete panels, which were used in the construction of houses of Khrushchev's building. Separate exposition: laboratory measuring equipment for metal and metal forms. The exposition demonstrates direct participation in the materials of concrete products and concrete products.
