= EZD =

EZD can refer to:

- Philippines AirAsia, a low-cost airline from the Philippines, by ICAO code
- AirAsia Zest, a now-defunct low-cost airline from the Philippines that merged into Philippines AirAsia in 2015, by ICAO code
- Zduńska Wola County, a county in central Poland, by car plate code
- EZ-D, prototype name of Flexplay, a disposable home video format
