= ESBO =

ESBO may refer to:

- Epoxidized soybean oil, a part of the PVC plastics manufacturing process
- Eisenbahn-Bau- und Betriebsordnung für Schmalspurbahnen, a German regulation for narrow-gauge railways
- Esbo (Finnish: Espoo), a city in Finland
