= Bronzing (disambiguation) =

Bronzing is a process by which a bronze-like surface is applied to other materials.

Bronzing may also refer to:

- Bronzing (skin), the act of exposing the skin to ultraviolet radiation for the purpose of darkening skin color
- CD bronzing, a specific variant of CD rot
