= Diethylene glycol dinitrate =

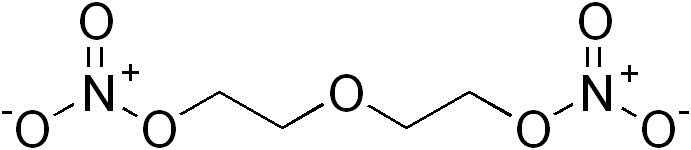

Names
- Preferred IUPAC name Oxydi(ethane-2,1-diyl) dinitrate
- Other names Diethyleneglycol dinitrate Diethyl glycol dinitrate Oxydiethylene dinitrate DEGDN

Identifiers
| CAS Number | 693-21-0 |
| 3D model (JSmol) | Interactive image |
| ChemSpider | 55142 |
| ECHA InfoCard | 100.010.679 |
| PubChem CID | 61198 |
| UNII | 77W50O99G1 |
| UN number | 0075 |
| CompTox Dashboard (EPA) | DTXSID1024047 |
- InChI: InChI=1S/C4H8N2O7/c7-5(8)12-3-1-11-2-4-13-6(9)10/h1-4H2 Key: LYAGTVMJGHTIDH-UHFFFAOYSA-N; InChI=1/C4H8N2O7/c7-5(8)12-3-1-11-2-4-13-6(9)10/h1-4H2 Key: LYAGTVMJGHTIDH-UHFFFAOYAD
- SMILES: C(CO[N+](=O)[O-])OCCO[N+](=O)[O-]

Properties
| Chemical formula | C_{4}H_{8}N_{2}O_{7} |
| Molar mass | 196.115 g·mol^{−1} |
| Appearance | Colorless oily liquid |
| Odor | Odorless |
| Density | 1.4092 g/mL (0 °C); 1.3846 g/mL (20 °C) |
| Melting point | −11.5 °C (11.3 °F; 261.6 K) |
| Boiling point | 197 °C (387 °F; 470 K) (decomposes) |
| Solubility in water | 4.1 g/L (24 °C) |
| Solubility | Soluble in methanol, acetic acid |
| Vapor pressure | 0.007 mmHg (22.4 °C) |
- Except where otherwise noted, data are given for materials in their standard state (at 25 °C [77 °F], 100 kPa). verify (what is ?) Infobox references

Diethylene glycol dinitrate (DEGDN) is an explosive nitrated alcohol ester with the formula C_{4}H_{8}N_{2}O_{7}. It is commonly used as a plasticizer in propellant or explosive formulations. While chemically similar to numerous other high explosives, pure diethylene glycol dinitrate is difficult to ignite. Ignition typically requires localized heating to the decomposition point unless the DEGDN is first atomized. It is sensitive to detonation by impact but not due to friction.

== Preparation and uses ==
Diethylene glycol dinitrate can be made by nitration of diethylene glycol with nitric acid in the presence of a dehydrating agent, such as concentrated sulfuric acid.

== Toxicity ==
If ingested, like nitroglycerine, it rapidly causes vasodilation through the release of nitric oxide, a physiological signaling molecule that relaxes vascular smooth muscle which leads to a rapid loss in blood pressure. Other acute effects include convulsions and loss of consciousness. Its median lethal dose (LD50) is 650 mg/kg in guinea pigs.

== Uses ==
DEGDN can be mixed with nitrocellulose or nitroglycol to form a colloid which is used in smokeless powder for artillery and rocket propellant. During World War II, the Kriegsmarine frequently used this mixture in their artillery.

Triethylene glycol dinitrate, diethylene glycol dinitrate, and trimethylolethane trinitrate can be used as less-sensitive replacements for nitroglycerin in propellants.

== See also ==
- Triethylene glycol dinitrate
- Ethylene glycol dinitrate
- TNT equivalent
- RE factor
