= DIVX =

DVD-based format created as an alternative to video rental

- Media type: Optical disc
- Encoding: Same as a DVD, but with DRM
- Capacity: 4.7 GB (single-sided, single-layer), 9.4 GB (double-sided, single-layer)
- Developed by: Digital Video Express, LP
- Usage: Standard definition video and standard definition sound
- Extended from: DVD
- Released: June 8, 1998
- Discontinued: June 16, 1999

DIVX (Digital Video Express) is a discontinued digital video format. Created in part by Circuit City, it was an unsuccessful attempt to create an alternative to video rental in the United States by the mid–late 1990s. The format's poor reception from consumers resulted in major financial losses for Circuit City and is credited with being part of the company's downfall.

== Format ==
DIVX is a format variation on the DVD player in which a customer would buy a DIVX disc (similar to a DVD) for approximately $4.50 USD, which was watchable for up to 48 hours from its initial viewing. After this period, the disc could be viewed by paying a continuation fee to play it for two more days. Viewers who wanted to watch a disc an unlimited number of times could convert the disc to a "DIVX silver" disc for an additional fee. "DIVX gold" discs that could be played an unlimited number of times on any DIVX player were announced at the time of DIVX's introduction, but no DIVX gold titles were ever released.

Each DIVX disc is marked with a unique barcode in the burst cutting area that can be read by the player, and was used to track the discs. The status of the discs was monitored through an account over a phone line. DIVX player owners had to set up an account with DIVX to which additional viewing fees could be charged. The player would call an account server over the phone line to charge for viewing fees similar to the way DirecTV and Dish Network satellite systems handle pay-per-view.

In addition to the normal Content Scramble System (CSS) encryption, DIVX discs use Triple DES encryption and an alternative channel modulation coding scheme, which prevents them from being read in standard DVD players. Most of the discs were manufactured by United Kingdom-based Nimbus CD International.

DIVX players manufactured by Zenith Electronics (who went bankrupt shortly before the launch of the format), Thomson Consumer Electronics (RCA and ProScan), and Matsushita Electric (Panasonic) started to become available in mid-1998. These players differ from regular DVD players with the addition of a security IC chip (powered by ARM RISC and manufactured by VLSI) that controls the encode/decode of the digital content. Mail systems were included on some players as well. Because of widespread studio support, manufacturers anticipated that demand for the units would be high. Initially, the players were approximately twice as expensive as standard DVD players, but price reductions occurred within months of release.

== History ==
=== Development and launch ===
DIVX was introduced on September 8, 1997 (after previously being made under the code name Zoom TV), with the format under development since 1995. The format was a partnership between Circuit City and entertainment law firm Ziffren, Brittenham, Branca & Fischer, with the former company investing $100 million into the latter firm. One advertiser attempted to sign with the company, but was unable to do so, which spurred a lawsuit between the two.

The product made a quiet showing at the Consumer Electronics Show in Las Vegas in early January 1998, but won the attention of 20th Century Fox, which on February 20, 1998 signed a deal to release their titles on the format. After multiple delays, the initial trial of the DIVX format was run in the San Francisco, California and Richmond, Virginia areas starting on June 8, 1998. Initially, only a single Zenith player was available starting at $499, along with 20 to 50 titles. Very few players sold during this time period, with The Good Guys chain alleging that fewer than 10 players were sold. A nationwide rollout began three months later, on September 21, again with only one Zenith player and 150 titles available in 190 stores in the western U.S.

At the format's launch, DIVX was sold primarily through the Circuit City, Good Guys, and Ultimate Electronics retailers. The format was promoted to consumers as an alternative to traditional video rental schemes with the promise of "No returns, no late fees." Though consumers could just discard a DIVX disc after the initial viewing period, several DIVX retailers maintained DIVX recycling bins on their premises. On September 22, 1998, the Canadian retailer Future Shop announced plans to carry DIVX at its 23 US locations. Thomson's player, after multiple delays, arrived on October 3, 1998, followed by Panasonic's on December 10. The format made its overall national debut on October 12, 1998. A marketing push began that November for the 1998 holiday season, with more than $1 million going into the campaign. The fortunes of the format would seemingly turn for the better in mid-December 1998, when a shortage of DVD players occurred. In total, 87,000 players were sold during the final quarter of 1998, with 535,000 discs across 300 titles being sold, although fewer than 17,000 accounts for DIVX were created.

=== Opposition ===
Almost immediately after the format's reveal, a movement on the Internet was initiated against DIVX, particularly in home theater forums by existing owners of the then-still nascent DVD format. Broader groups of consumers had environmental concerns with the format, since under the advertised "no returns" model a disc would be discarded as waste once the initial user was done with it, rather than being reused as they were under the traditional rental model. Both companies that created the DVD format (Sony and Toshiba) also denounced DIVX, as did major studio distributor Warner Home Video (which was the first major American studio to distribute DVD) and the DVD Forum (a consortium of developers on the format who standardized DVDs). Titles in the DIVX catalog were released primarily in pan and scan format with limited special features, usually only a trailer (although a few widescreen titles did arrive on the format in early December 1998). This caused many home theater enthusiasts to become concerned that the success of DIVX would significantly diminish the release of films on the DVD format in the films' original aspect ratios and with supplementary material. Some early demos were also noted to have unique instances of artifacting on the discs that were not present on standard DVDs. Many people in various technology and entertainment communities were afraid that there would be DIVX exclusive releases, and that the then-fledgling DVD format would suffer as a result. DreamWorks, 20th Century Fox, and Paramount Pictures, for instance, initially released their films exclusively on the DIVX format (something that DIVX did not originally intend to happen). DIVX featured stronger encryption technology than DVD (Triple DES instead of CSS), which many studios stated was a contributing factor in the decision to support DIVX. Others cited the higher price of DIVX-compatible DVD players and rental costs as their reason for opposing the format, with one declaring DIVX as "holding my VCR hostage". One online poll surveyed 786 people on the format, of which nearly 97% disapproved of the format's concept, and another poll in December 1998 reflected 86% disapproval even if the format were free – a testament to the fierce online backlash the format received. As early as December 1997, news outlets were already calling the format a failure for Circuit City.

In addition to the hostile Internet response, competitors such as Hollywood Video ran advertisements touting the benefits of "Open DVD" over DIVX, with one ad in the Los Angeles Times depicting a hand holding a telephone line with the caption: "Don't let anyone feed you the line." The terminology "Open DVD" had been used by DVD supporters and later Sony themselves; in response to DIVX's labeling of DVD as "Basic DVD" and DIVX/DVD players as "DIVX-enhanced". Other retailers, such as Best Buy, also had their concerns, most of them citing possible customer confusion and cumbersomeness with the two formats. Pay-per-view companies were also concerned with the format intruding on their business sector, namely with their objective of single-use rentals of a film being offered to the consumer.

Early concerns of alleged or feared constant usage of the phone line proved to be somewhat exaggerated, as all players needed to do was verify its usage twice a month. Despite this, informational-freedom advocates were concerned that the players' "dial-home" ability could be used to spy on people's watching habits, as well as copyright and privacy concerns about its licensing of the media, with some alleging it violated fair-use laws entirely.

Allegations of anti-competitive vaporware, as well as concerns within the software industry prompted David Dranove of Northwestern University and Neil Gandal of Tel Aviv University and University of California, Berkeley, to conduct an empirical study designed to measure the effect of the DIVX announcement on the DVD market. This study suggests that the DIVX announcement slowed the adoption of DVD technology. According to Dranove and Gandal, the study suggests that the "general antitrust concern about vaporware seems justified".

=== Demise ===
Right after the launch of the format, Circuit City announced that despite a gain of 4.1% in net profit, huge expenses of launching that format (among other issues) massively undercut that profit. As early as September 1998, Circuit City was looking for partners to share their losses from the format's launch. Retailers such as Blockbuster Video did not carry the format at all.

The format's credibility suffered another blow when suspicions were raised about the nature of apparently independent pro-DIVX websites. Circuit City denied any involvement in creating these sites, one of which closed shortly after tech journalists tried to contact its webmaster.

DIVX and Thomson Consumer Electronics teamed up in January 1999 to create another format made for high-definition video using existing DVD technology, predating the development of both Blu-ray and HD DVD by many years. The market share for DIVX players was 23% in January 1999, and by that March, around 419 titles were available in the DIVX format. Sales for the format quickly fell off after the 1998 holiday season, however, with all three third-party retailers pulling out of DIVX sales by that point. In May, studio support for DIVX would start to be phased out with Paramount refusing to convert their titles to "Silver" discs (and then later stopping DIVX releases entirely), and Disney increasing their DVD activity. By the format's first anniversary, the future of the format was very grim - with only five DIVX-compatible players (and no DIVX-compatible computer drives), 478 titles, and only Circuit City selling DIVX discs.

The format was discontinued on June 16, 1999, because of the costs of introducing the format, as well as its very limited acceptance by the general public and retailers. At the end of the format's life, Circuit City announced a $114 million after-tax loss, and Variety estimated the total loss on the scheme was around $337 million. Over the next two years, the DIVX system was phased out. Customers could still view all their DIVX discs and were given a $100 refund for every player that was purchased before June 16, 1999. All discs that were unsold at the end of the summer of 1999 were destroyed. The program officially cut off access to accounts on July 7, 2001. The player's Security Module, which had an internal Real-Time Clock, ceased to allow DIVX functions after 30 days without a connection to the central system. Unsold players were liquidated in online auctions, but not before being modified to remove the DIVX Security Module. As a result, certain player models demonstrated lockups when DIVX menus were accessed.

On the company website to announce discontinuation of the product on June 16, 1999, it stated: "All DIVX-featured DVD players are fully functional DVD players and will continue to operate as such. All DIVX discs, including those previously purchased by consumers and those remaining in retailer inventories, can be viewed on registered players anytime between now and June 30, 2001. Subsequent viewings also will be available during that period. Discs can no longer be upgraded to unlimited viewing, known as DIVX Silver. Customers who have converted discs to DIVX Silver can continue viewing the discs until June 30, 2001, or can receive a full refund of the conversion price at their request". This meant no DIVX discs could play any content after June 30, 2001, rendering the medium worthless.

DIVX appeared as a "dishonorable mention" alongside PC World's list of "25 Worst Tech Products of All Time" in 2006.

== Hardware ==
A total of four DIVX players were released in 1998:

- Zenith DVX2100 (June 8, 1998)
- RCA RC-5230Z (October 3, 1998)
- Proscan PS8680Z (November 24, 1998)
- Panasonic DVD-X410 (December 10, 1998)

Several DIVX players from other manufacturers were announced for the year 1999, but canceled. This includes Harman Kardon, JVC, Pioneer and Kenwood, with the latter canceling a late 1999 to early 2000 release.

== Custom Video Discs (CVD) ==
Custom Video Discs (CVDs) are a specialised type of DVD used primarily by Swank Motion Pictures to distribute early-window theatrical content securely. Similar to the DIVX, CVDs employ additional content protection measures to restrict unauthorised copying and playback. Unlike DIVX—which required proprietary players and online activation—CVDs are designed to play only on standard DVD players and use embedded PIN codes (which is distributed via email or SMS messaging) in order to authorise playback.

CVDs feature a plain white surface with black text and incorporate multiple layers of digital rights management (DRM) directly on the disc. The PIN system requires users to enter a four-digit code sent to authorised parties before playback can begin. These discs are typically distributed in standard definition with stereo audio and do not support computer playback or Blu-ray players. CVDs also do not support closed captioning, leaving only open captioning available. The format is primarily intended for institutional or theatrical use where secure content distribution is critical.

== List of films available on DIVX ==
- 101 Dalmatians (1996)
- 54 (1998)
- 8 Heads in a Duffel Bag (1997)
- The Abyss (1989)
- Air Bud: Golden Receiver (1998)
- Affliction (1997)
- Alice in Wonderland (1951)
- Alien Resurrection (1997)
- An American Werewolf in Paris (1997)
- Amistad (1997)
- Another 48 Hrs. (1990)
- Antz (1998)
- Apollo 13 (1995)
- The Apostle (1997)
- Armageddon (1998)
- Armour of God II: Operation Condor (1991)
- Army of Darkness (1992)
- At First Sight (1999)
- A Thousand Acres (1997)
- Babe (1995)
- Backdraft (1991)
- BASEketball (1998)
- Beloved (1998)
- Blown Away (1994)
- The Blues Brothers (1980)
- Born on the Fourth of July (1989)
- Brassed Off (1996)
- Brazil (1985)
- The Breakfast Club (1985)
- Brubaker (1980)
- Bulworth (1998)
- The Boxer (1997)
- A Bug's Life (1998)
- The Chamber (1996)
- Chairman of the Board (1998)
- Chasing Amy (1997)
- A Civil Action (1998)
- Coming to America (1988)
- Con Air (1997)
- Conan the Destroyer (1984)
- Cop Land (1997)
- Courage Under Fire (1996)
- Crimson Tide (1995)
- The Crow (1994)
- The Crow: City of Angels (1996)
- Dante's Peak (1997)
- Daylight (1996)
- The Day of the Jackal (1973)
- Death Becomes Her (1992)
- Deep Impact (1998)
- Deep Rising (1998)
- Die Hard With a Vengeance (1995)
- Dirty Work (1998)
- Disturbing Behavior (1998)
- Dr. Dolittle (1998)
- Dragnet (1987)
- The Edge (1997)
- Ed Wood (1994)
- The Eiger Sanction (1975)
- Enemy of the State (1998)
- The End of Violence (1997)
- The English Patient (1996)
- Escape from L.A. (1996)
- Ever After (1998)
- Evita (1996)
- Far and Away (1992)
- Father of the Bride Part II (1995)
- Fled (1996)
- The Flintstones (1994)
- For Richer or Poorer (1997)
- From Dusk till Dawn (1996)
- The Full Monty (1997)
- Gang Related (1997)
- George of the Jungle (1997)
- GoldenEye (1995)
- Goldfinger (1964)
- The Ghost and the Darkness (1996)
- G.I. Jane (1997)
- Good Will Hunting (1997)
- Hackers (1995)
- Happy Gilmore (1996)
- Half-Baked (1998)
- Halloween H20: 20 Years Later (1998)
- Hard Rain (1998)
- The Hard Way (1991)
- Highlander: The Final Dimension (1994)
- Holy Man (1998)
- Hope Floats (1998)
- The Horse Whisperer (1998)
- Houseguest (1995)
- The Hunt for Red October (1990)
- The Impostors (1998)
- In Dreams (1999)
- Invasion of the Body Snatchers (1978)
- The Jackal (1997)
- Jane Austen's Mafia! (1998)
- Judge Dredd (1995)
- Kindergarten Cop (1990)
- Kissing a Fool (1998)
- Kiss the Girls (1997)
- Liar Liar (1997)
- A Life Less Ordinary (1997)
- The Madness of King George (1994)
- The Man in the Iron Mask (1998)
- Meet Joe Black (1998)
- Mercury Rising (1998)
- Miami Rhapsody (1995)
- Mighty Joe Young (1998)
- Mr. Magoo (1997)
- Mrs. Doubtfire (1993)
- MouseHunt (1997)
- Mulholland Falls (1996)
- Nothing to Lose (1997)
- The Object of My Affection (1998)
- Office Space (1999)
- One True Thing (1998)
- Oscar and Lucinda (1997)
- Paulie (1998)
- Paths of Glory (1957)
- Patriot Games (1992)
- Patch Adams (1998)
- The Peacemaker (1997)
- Phantoms (1998)
- Phenomenon (1996)
- Primary Colors (1998)
- Private Parts (1997)
- Psycho (1960)
- Pulp Fiction (1994)
- Rain Man (1988)
- Rapid Fire (1992)
- Rising Sun (1993)
- The River (1984)
- The Rock (1996)
- RocketMan (1997)
- Rollerball (1975)
- Ronin (1998)
- Scream (1996)
- Scream 2 (1997)
- The Shadow (1994)
- The Siege (1998)
- Simon Birch (1998)
- Six Days Seven Nights (1998)
- Sling Blade (1996)
- Slums of Beverly Hills (1998)
- Small Soldiers (1998)
- Sneakers (1992)
- Species II (1998)
- Speed (1994)
- Speed 2: Cruise Control (1997)
- Spy Hard (1996)
- Street Fighter (1994)
- Star Trek: First Contact (1996)
- Star Trek Generations (1994)
- Strange Days (1995)
- Supercop (1992)
- That Thing You Do! (1996)
- There's Something About Mary (1998)
- The Thin Red Line (1998)
- The Thing (1982)
- Tombstone (1993)
- Tomorrow Never Dies (1997)
- True Lies (1994)
- Twelve Monkeys (1995)
- Twilight (1998)
- Ulee's Gold (1997)
- Volcano (1997)
- Waking Ned Devine (1998)
- A Walk in the Clouds (1995)
- WarGames (1983)
- The Waterboy (1998)
- Welcome to Sarajevo (1997)
- Wing Commander (1999)
- The X-Files (1998)
- Young Frankenstein (1974)

== See also ==
- Planned obsolescence
- Digital rights management
- Flexplay (another disposable DVD format)
- DVD-D (another disposable DVD format)
