= List of UN numbers 0001 to 0100 =

UN numbers from UN 0001 to UN 0100 as assigned by the United Nations Committee of Experts on the Transport of Dangerous Goods are as follows:

== UN 0001 to UN 0100 ==
UN Number	Class	Proper Shipping Name
UN 0001	?	(UN No. no longer in use) Alarm devices, explosive (UN No. no longer in use)
UN 0002 to UN 0003	?	(UN No.s no longer in use)
UN 0004	1.1D	Ammonium picrate, dry or wetted with less than 10 percent water, by mass
UN 0005	1.1F	Cartridges for weapons, with bursting charge
UN 0006	1.1E	Cartridges for weapons, with bursting charge
UN 0007	1.2F	Cartridges for weapons, with bursting charge
UN 0008	?	(UN No. no longer in use)
UN 0009	1.2G	Ammunition, incendiary with or without burster, expelling charge, or propelling charge
UN 0010	1.3G	Ammunition, incendiary with or without burster, expelling charge, or propelling charge
UN 0011	?	(UN No. no longer in use)
UN 0012	1.4S	Cartridges for weapons, inert projectile or Cartridges, small arms
UN 0013	?	(UN No. no longer in use)
UN 0014	1.4S	Cartridges for weapons, blank or Cartridges, small arms, blank
UN 0015	1.2G	Ammunition, smoke with or without burster, expelling charge, or propelling charge
UN 0016	1.3G	Ammunition, smoke with or without burster, expelling charge, or propelling charge
UN 0017	?	(UN No. no longer in use)
UN 0018	1.2G	Ammunition, tear-producing with burster, expelling charge, or propelling charge
UN 0019	1.3G	Ammunition, tear-producing with burster, expelling charge, or propelling charge
UN 0020	1.2K	Ammunition, toxic with burster, expelling charge, or propelling charge
UN 0021	1.3K	Ammunition, toxic with burster, expelling charge, or propelling charge
UN 0022	?	(UN No. no longer in use) Amorces
UN 0023 to UN 0026	?	(UN No.s no longer in use)
UN 0027	1.1D	Black powder or Gunpowder, granular or as a meal
UN 0028	1.1D	Black powder, compressed or Gunpowder, compressed or Black powder, in pellets or Gunpowder, in pellets
UN 0029	1.1B	Detonators, non-electric, for blasting
UN 0030	1.1B	Detonators, electric, for blasting
UN 0031 to UN 0032	?	(UN No.s no longer in use)
UN 0033	1.1F	Bombs, with bursting charge
UN 0034	1.1D	Bombs, with bursting charge
UN 0035	1.2D	Bombs, with bursting charge
UN 0036	?	(UN No. no longer in use)
UN 0037	1.1F	Bombs, photo-flash
UN 0038	1.1D	Bombs, photo-flash
UN 0039	1.2G	Bombs, photo-flash
UN 0040 to UN 0041	?	(UN No.s no longer in use)
UN 0042	1.1D	Boosters, without detonator
UN 0043	1.1D	Bursters, explosive
UN 0044	1.4S	Primers, cap type
UN 0045 to UN 0047	?	(UN No.s no longer in use)
UN 0048	1.1D	Charges, demolition
UN 0049	1.1G	Cartridges, flash
UN 0050	1.3G	Cartridges, flash
UN 0051 to UN 0053	?	(UN No.s no longer in use)
UN 0054	1.3G	Cartridges, signal
UN 0055	1.4S	Cases, cartridge, empty with primer
UN 0056	1.1D	Charges, depth
UN 0057 to UN 0058	?	(UN No.s no longer in use)
UN 0059	1.1D	Charges, shaped, without detonator
UN 0060	1.1D	Charges, supplementary explosive
UN 0061 to UN 0064	?	(UN No.s no longer in use)
UN 0065	1.1D	Cord, detonating, flexible
UN 0066	1.4G	Cord, igniter
UN 0067 to UN 0069	?	(UN No.s no longer in use)
UN 0070	1.4S	Cutters, cable, explosive
UN 0071	?	(UN No. no longer in use)
UN 0072	1.1D	Cyclotrimethylenetrinitramine, wetted or Cyclonite, wetted or Hexogen, wetted or RDX, wetted with not less than 15 percent water by mass
UN 0073	1.1B	Detonators for ammunition
UN 0074	1.1A	Diazodinitrophenol, wetted with not less than 40 percent water or mixture of alcohol and water, by mass
UN 0075	1.1D	Diethylene glycol dinitrate, desensitized with not less than 25 percent non-volatile water-insoluble phlegmatizer, by mass
UN 0076	1.1D	Dinitrophenol, dry or wetted with less than 15 percent water, by mass
UN 0077	1.3C	Dinitrophenolates alkali metals, dry or wetted with less than 15 percent water, by mass
UN 0078	1.1D	Dinitroresorcinol, dry or wetted with less than 15 percent water, by mass
UN 0079	1.1D	Hexanitrodiphenylamine or Dipicrylamine or Hexyl
UN 0080	?	(UN No. no longer in use)
UN 0081	1.1D	Explosive, blasting, type A
UN 0082	1.1D	Explosive, blasting, type B
UN 0083	1.1D	Explosive, blasting, type C
UN 0084	1.1D	Explosive, blasting, type D
UN 0085 to UN 0091	?	(UN No.s no longer in use)
UN 0092	1.3D	Flares, surface
UN 0093	1.3G	Flares, aerial
UN 0094	1.1G	Flash powder
UN 0095	?	(UN No. no longer in use)
UN 0096	?	(UN No. no longer in use) Flash powder, photo-flash (UN No. no longer in use)
UN 0097 to UN 0098	?	(UN No.s no longer in use)
UN 0099	1.1D	Fracturing devices, explosives, without detonators for oil wells
UN 0100	?	(UN No. no longer in use)

== See also ==
- Lists of UN numbers
