= DVD-D =

Self-destructing disposable DVDs

DVD-Ds, also referred to as disposable DVDs, were a type of disposable digital versatile disc/digital video disc that were designed to be used for a maximum 48 hours after the containing package is opened. After this time, the DVDs became unreadable to DVD players because they contained a chemical that, after the set period of time, will prevent the underlying data from being read by DVD drives. The medium in itself was copy protection neutral and did not require additional digital rights management types of applications to be installed for the content to be accessible.

== See also ==
- DIVX and Flexplay, two other disposable disc formats
- Disc rot, the unintended decay of optical discs due to physical or chemical deterioration
- Planned obsolescence
