= Disc rot =

Tendency of optical discs to become unreadable

Disc rot is the tendency of CDs, DVDs, or other optical discs to become unreadable because of chemical deterioration. The causes include oxidation of the reflective layer, reactions with contaminants, ultra-violet light damage, and de-bonding of the adhesive used to adhere the layers of the disc together.

== Causes ==
In CDs, the reflective layer is immediately beneath a thin protective layer of lacquer, and is also exposed at the edge of the disc. The lacquer protecting the edge of an optical disc can usually be seen without magnification. It is rarely uniformly thick; thickness variations are usually visible. The reflective layer is typically aluminium, which reacts easily with several commonly encountered chemicals such as oxygen, sulfur, and certain ions carried by liquid water. In ordinary use, a surface layer of aluminium oxide is formed quickly when an aluminium surface is exposed to the atmosphere; it serves as passivation for the bulk aluminium with regard to many, but not all, contaminants. CD reflective layers are so thin that this passivation is less effective. In the case of CD-R and CD-RW media, the materials used in the reflecting layer are more complex than a simple aluminium layer, but also can present problems if contaminated. The thin 0.25-0.5mm layer of protective lacquer is equivalent.

DVDs have a different structure from CDs, using a plastic disc over the reflecting layer. This means that a scratch on either surface of a DVD is not as likely to reach the reflective layer and expose it to environmental contamination which can cause corrosion. Since disc rot is often caused by the corrosion of aluminium, this means that DVDs are more resistant to disc rot. Each type of optical disc thus has different susceptibility to contamination and corrosion of its reflecting layer; furthermore, the writable and re-writable versions of each optical disc type are somewhat different as well. Finally, discs made with gold as the reflecting layer are considerably less vulnerable to chemical corrosion problems. Because they are less expensive, the industry has adopted aluminium reflecting layers as the standard for factory-pressed optical discs.

Blu-ray discs usually use a silver alloy layer instead of aluminium.

Several Warner Bros-distributed DVDs from 2006 to 2008 have been noted to suffer from disc rot as a result of a manufacturing issue. The issue was unaddressed until 2025 when Warner Bros. offered replacements for defective discs, and similar copies of previous releases which were already discontinued.

== Signs of disc rot ==
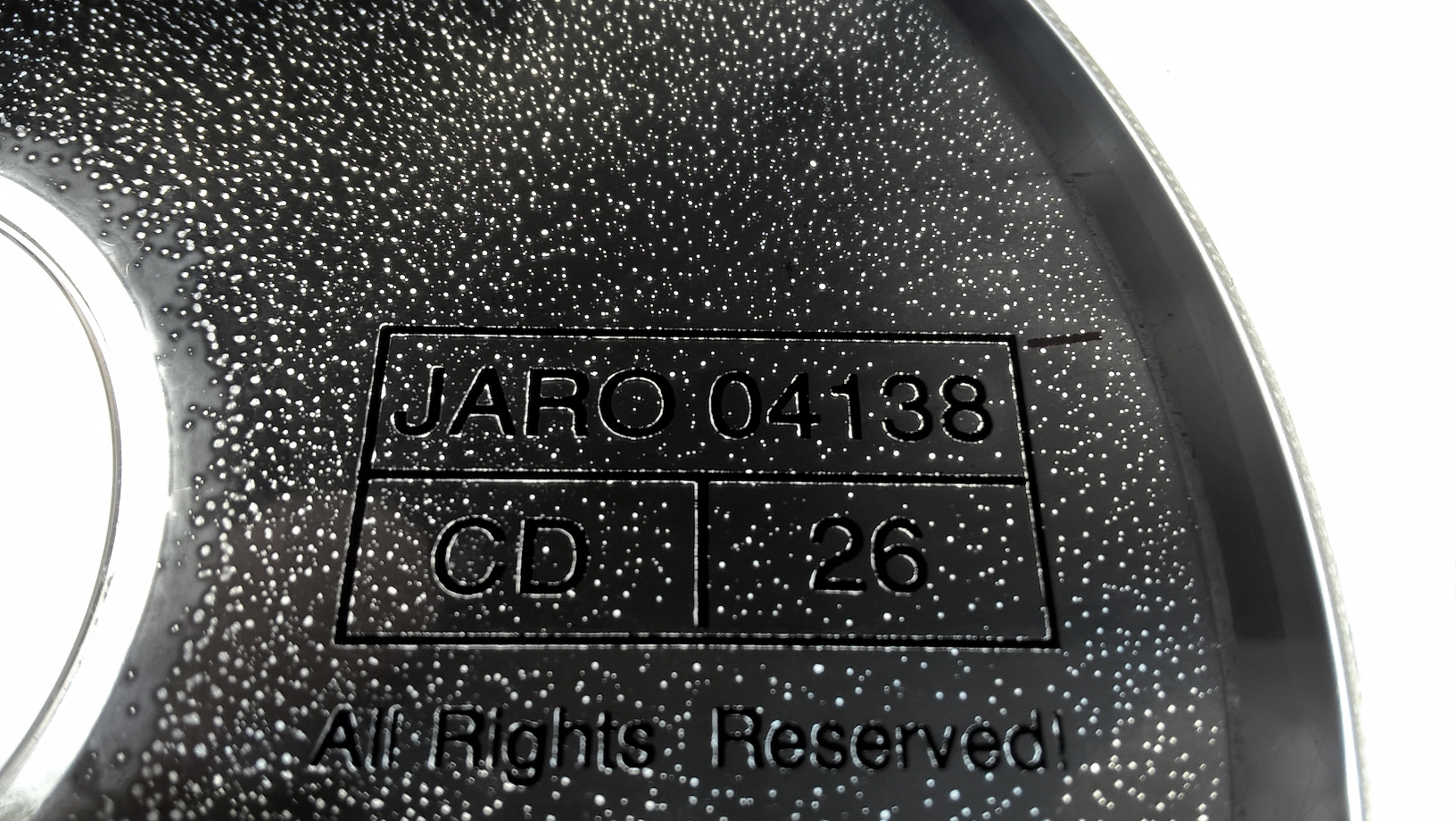
A severe case of disc rot on a CD

On CDs, the rot becomes visually noticeable in two ways:

1. When the CD is held up to a strong light, light shines through several pin-prick-sized holes.
2. Discoloration of the disc, which looks like a coffee stain on the disc. See also CD bronzing.

In audio CDs, the rot leads to scrambled or skipped audio or even the inability to play the disc.

Using surface error scanning to check the data integrity allows discovering loss of data integrity before uncorrectable errors occur.

== Variants ==
=== Laser rot ===
Video artifacts resulting from laser rot on a 1981 MCA Discovision pressing of The Electric Horseman.

Laser rot is the appearance of video and audio artifacts during the playback of LaserDiscs, and their progressive worsening over time. It is most commonly attributed to oxidation in the aluminium layers by poor quality adhesives used to bond the disc halves together. Poor adhesives separate over time, which allows oxygen in the air to corrode the thin aluminium layer into aluminium oxide, visible as transparent patches or small dots in the disc. Corrosion is possible due to the thinness of the layer; normally aluminium does not corrode because it is coated in a thin oxide layer that forms on contact with oxygen. Single-sided video discs did not appear to suffer from laser rot while double-sided discs did. The name "laser rot" is not necessarily a misnomer; although the degradation does not involve the player's laser, the "rot" refers to the LaserDisc itself.

Laser rot was indicated by the appearance of multi-colored speckles appearing in the video output of a LaserDisc during playback. The speckles increased in volume and frequency as the disc continued to degrade. Much of the early production run of MCA DiscoVision discs had severe laser rot. Also, in the 1990s, LaserDiscs manufactured by Sony's DADC plant in Terre Haute, Indiana were plagued by laser rot.

== See also ==
- Sticky-shed syndrome
- CD bronzing, a type of disc rot, affecting a subset of CDs and DVDs, causing a bronze-colored darkening of the playable surface and eventual loss of readability.
- Conservation and restoration of plastic objects
- Data rot, a similar concept
- DVD-D and Flexplay, disposable optical disc formats designed to become unplayable after a limited time
- M-Disc, an optical disc format claimed to have a reduced rate of rot compared to conventional DVDs
- Panchiko, a band who gained popularity in 2016 when a 2000 demo EP—which was notably distorted due to CD-R disc rot—was found in a charity shop.
- DVD § Disc quality measurements
- Compact disc § Integrity
