= Triethylene glycol dinitrate =

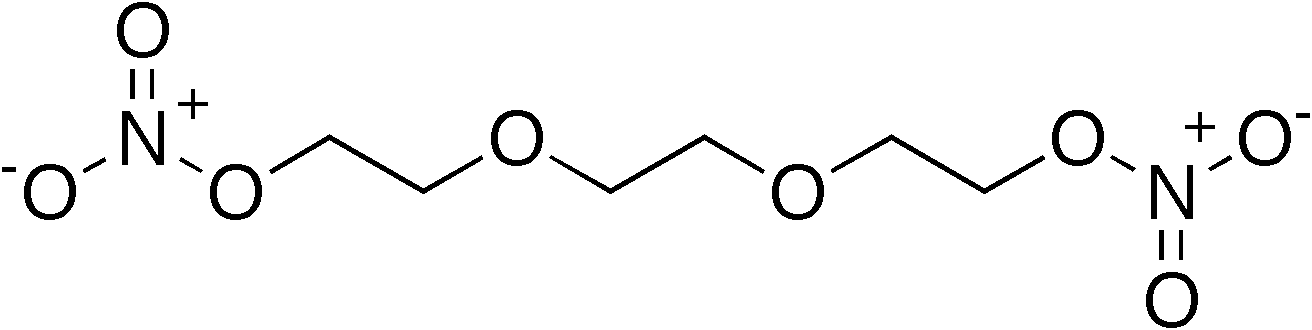

Names
- IUPAC name 2,2'-(Ethane-1,2-diylbis(oxy))bisethyl dinitrate ]
- Other names TEGDN

Identifiers
CAS Number	111-22-8
3D model (JSmol)	Interactive image
ChemSpider	7808
ECHA InfoCard	100.003.498
PubChem CID	8099
UNII	6X99UD6JTA
CompTox Dashboard (EPA)	DTXSID0051572
- InChI: InChI=1S/C6H12N2O8/c9-7(10)15-5-3-13-1-2-14-4-6-16-8(11)12/h1-6H2 Key: AGCQZYRSTIRJFM-UHFFFAOYSA-N
- SMILES: C(CO[N+](=O)[O-])OCCOCCO[N+](=O)[O-]

Properties
Chemical formula	C_{6}H_{12}N_{2}O_{8}
Molar mass	240.168 g·mol^{−1}
Appearance	pale yellow oily liquid
Density	1.33 g/cm^{3}
Melting point	−19 °C (−2 °F; 254 K)
- Except where otherwise noted, data are given for materials in their standard state (at 25 °C [77 °F], 100 kPa). verify (what is ?) Infobox references

Triethylene glycol dinitrate (TEGDN) is an, ether, nitrated alcohol ester of triethylene glycol. It is used as an energetic plasticizer in explosives and propellants. It is a pale yellow oily liquid. It is somewhat similar to nitroglycerin.

TEGDN is often used together with trimethylolethane trinitrate (TMETN).

Triethylene glycol dinitrate, diethylene glycol dinitrate, and trimethylolethane trinitrate are being considered as replacements for nitroglycerin in propellants.
