= Conservation and restoration of plastic objects =

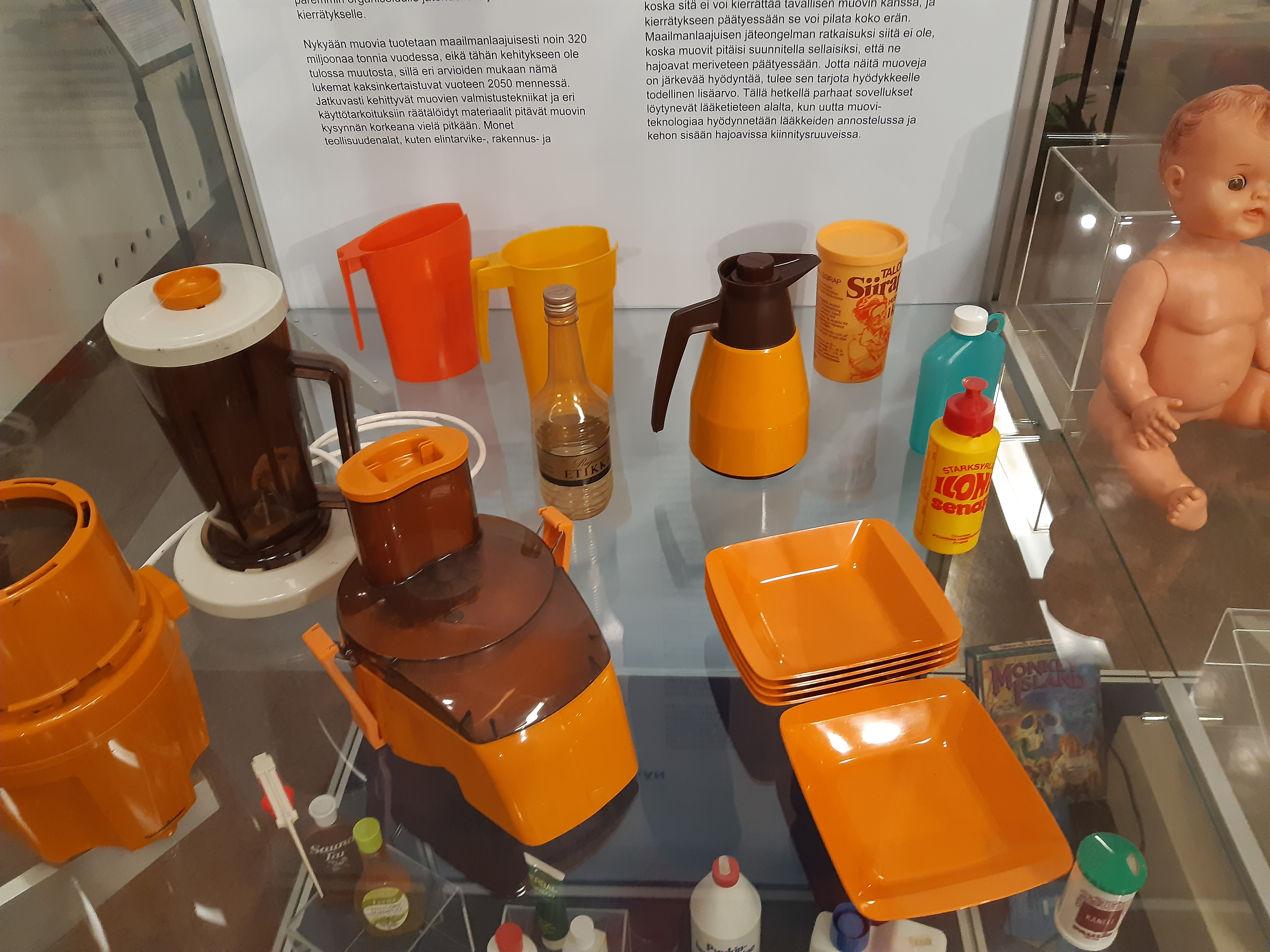
A variety of plastic objects conserved in a museum (Finland)

Conservation and restoration of objects made from plastics is work dedicated to the conservation of objects of historical and personal value made from plastics. When applied to cultural heritage, this activity is generally undertaken by a conservator-restorer.

== Background ==
Within museum collections, there are a variety of artworks and artifacts that are composed of organic plastic materials, either synthetic or semi-synthetic; these were created for a range of uses from artistic, to technical, to domestic use. Plastics have become an integral component of life, and many plastic artifacts have become cultural icons or objects worth preserving for the future. Although relatively new materials for museum collections, having originated in the 19th century, plastics are deteriorating at an alarming rate. This risks the loss not only of the objects themselves, but other nearby materials may also be degraded by outgassing or reactions with other released chemicals.

== Identification of plastics ==
If present, a numeric recycling code may provide clues about an item's composition.

Identification of plastic components of a collection is extremely important, because some plastics may release a harmful toxin or gas that can damage nearby objects. A preservation plan can be established to slow down the effects and protect a collection.

Plastics are identified by various methods, including trade name, trademark, or patent number. Depending on the manufacturer, different chemical formulas and materials may have been used to produce the plastic over the years. A recycling code may be present, giving general information about the material composition. Plastic composites or proprietary blends can be more difficult to identify.

If there are no markings to identify the type of plastic used, it may still be identified by using various types of spectroscopic technology such as optical spectrometer, Raman mid-infrared spectroscopy, and near-infrared spectroscopy, along with mass spectrometry. Other forms of identification include elemental analysis or thermal analysis to decipher the composition of plastics.

The Museum of Design in Plastics (MoDiP), has created a guide to plastic objects that includes the manufacturing dates and manufacturing processes, along with its typical characteristics such as feel and smell. If an object in a collection has characteristics that differ from what is expected, it is possible that the piece has begun to deteriorate.

In 2022, the Getty Conservation Institute published a book on the properties of commonly used plastics and elastomers, including 56 "fact sheets" summarizing important characteristics of the materials, and methods of identification.

== Common plastics ==
The list below is of chemical compositions that make up common plastics found in museum collections. These are some plastics that may degrade, but are not seriously harmful to nearby objects:

- Non-plasticized (rigid) polyvinyl chloride (PVC)

The following are "malignant" plastic materials that will age rapidly if left untreated, and which have a higher risk of off-gassing or releasing toxic materials that can damage surrounding objects:

- Polyvinyl chloride treated with plasticizers
- Polyurethane
- Cellulose esters, including cellulose nitrate and cellulose acetate
- Vulcanized rubber
- Biodegradable plastics

Environmental concerns have driven recent changes in plastic manufacturing towards biodegradable plastics, with a potentially negative effect upon the long-term stability of such materials within museum collections.

== Deterioration ==
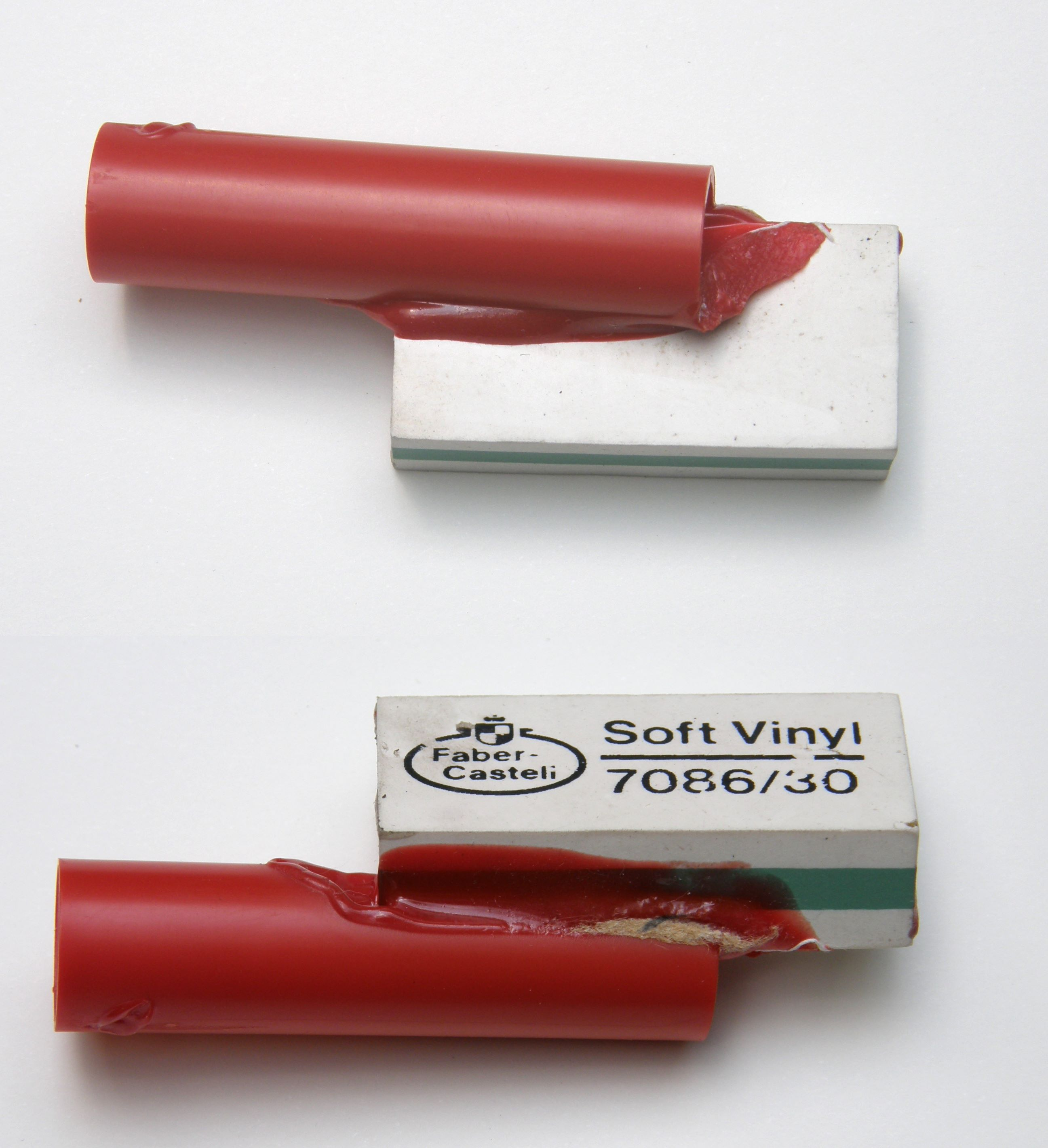
Over several years, plasticizers in a soft vinyl eraser have migrated to partially dissolve a plastic pen cap.

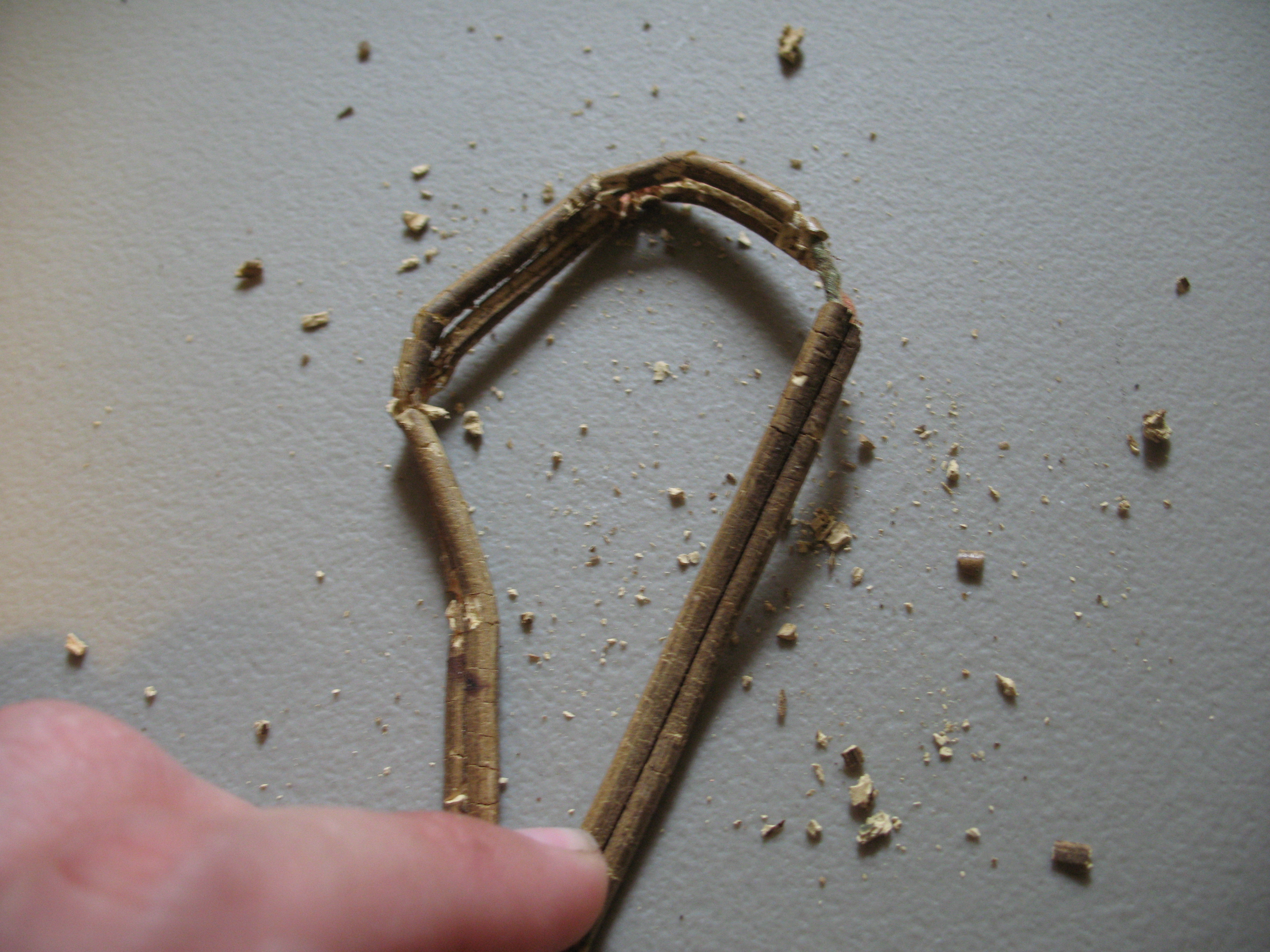
Loss of plasticizers over 50 years caused embrittlement of electrical lampcord.

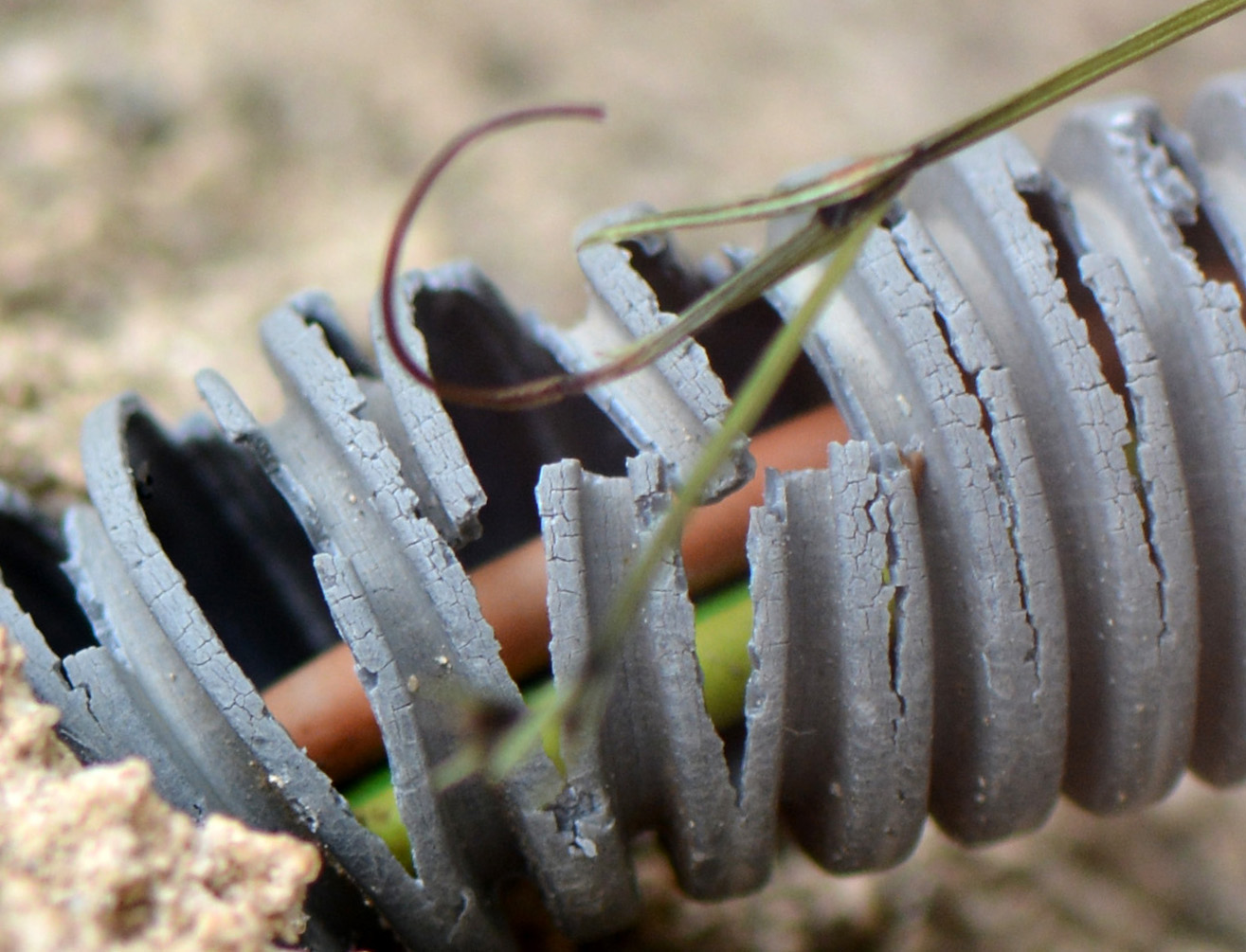
Outdoors UV radiation effects on vulnerable PVC conduit

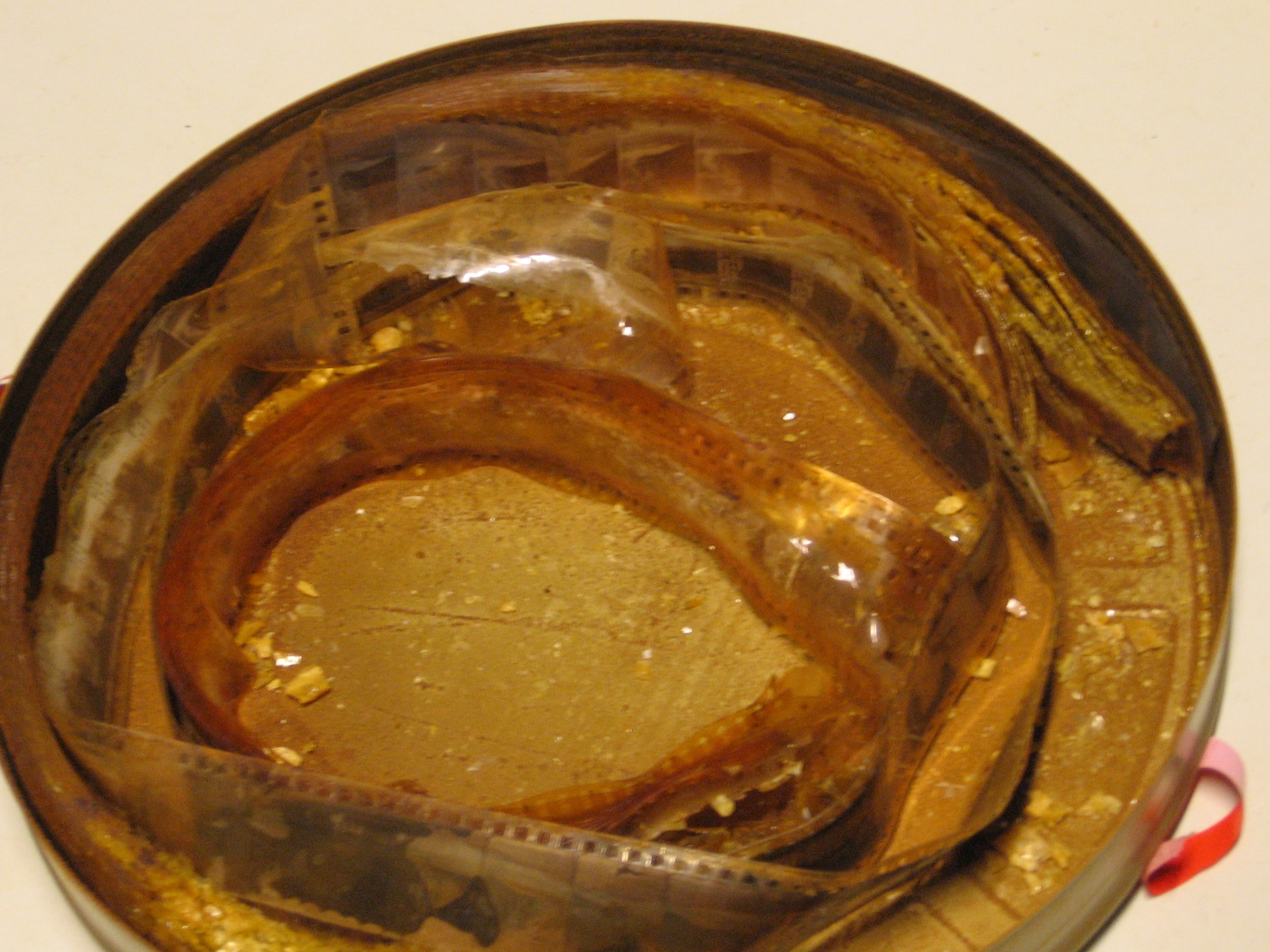
Decayed cellulose nitrate film

A difficult aspect of plastic deterioration is that one cannot see what types of chemical reactions are occurring in the interior of an object, or easily identify the makeup of proprietary plastic composites. Many plastics will give off a distinct odor, ooze liquids, or will begin to shrink or crack in some way as they age. Although deterioration cannot always be stopped, it is important to know the causes and be able to mitigate or slow damage.

=== Causes ===
The causes of deterioration regarding plastics can be linked to age, chemical composition, storage, and improper handling of the objects:

- Age – When plastics were first manufactured in the 19th century, they were derived directly from organic materials; over the years these objects have usually deteriorated due to lack of knowledge and improper handling of the early plastics.
- Chemical – Depending on an object's chemical composition, conservators can understand how it will react over time. Other chemical reactions are driven by heat, oxygen, light, liquids, additives, and biological attacks.
- Storage – Improper storage of plastic artifacts can allow contamination and deterioration to occur. This often occurs when temperature or relative humidity fluctuate in the storage area, and this may cause the polymers to react to the environment, to deteriorate, and possibly to contaminate surrounding objects. Maintaining stable storage conditions is also important when an object is on exhibit. When the object is lighted and on display, its temperature and humidity can fluctuate. Conditions inside the exhibit case must be monitored and adjusted when necessary, to help prevent any damage.
- Improper handling – Improper cleaning techniques when using water or solvents on incompatible materials can cause damage. Also, human error when handling objects can occur, causing abrasions or scratches.

=== Chemical processes ===
Understanding the different types of plastic chemical degradation helps in planning specific measures to protect plastic artifacts. Listed below are types of chemical reactions that accelerate the deterioration of the polymer's structure:

- Photo-oxidative degradation occurs when plastic degrades from exposure to ultraviolet (UV) or visible light; the most damaging wavelengths depend on the composition of the polymer. In general, plastic will be affected by light, and it is best practice to keep plastic away from light sources as much as possible, especially during longterm storage.
- Thermal degradation affects the entire bulk volume of the polymer making up an object, and is strongly affected by the temperature and amount of light exposure.
- Ozone-induced degradation will deteriorate saturated and unsaturated polymers when the plastic is exposed to atmospheric ozone. A test can be conducted to see if the object has been exposed, by taking small samples for analysis using Fourier-transform infrared spectroscopy (FTIR).
- Catalytic degradation mainly focuses on plastic waste polymers as they are transformed into hydrocarbons.
- Biodegradation causes the surface or the strength of the plastic to change; this process eventually decomposes vulnerable materials into carbon dioxide and water as microbes consume components of the material.
- Hydroperoxide decomposition occurs when metal and metal ions within the plastic material lead to the deterioration of the object
- Plasticizer migration occurs when additive chemicals intended to keep a plastic resin soft and pliable gradually move to the surface or are shed from an object. The loss of these chemicals causes the plastic to revert to a brittle state, often shrinking or distorting in shape. The migrating chemicals may cause other nearby objects to deform or otherwise degrade. In addition, many plasticizers, such as phthalates or bisphenol A (BPA) may be toxic, hormone disruptors, or carcinogenic in their biological effects.

Effects of UV, light, moisture and pollutants (including solvents) on plastics
Plastic	UV radiation and excess light (photolysis, photo-oxidation)	Moisture (high relative humidity) and moisture fluctuations (hydrolysis, swelling, shrinkage)	Pollutants	Effects on other nearby materials (stains, corrosion, stickiness, gases)
Acrylics	resistant	resistant	dissolved, swelled, stress, cracking	none
Casein-formaldehyde, protein derivatives		formaldehyde gas, cracking due to swelling/shrinking, moldy appearance, brittle when dry	swell by water, resistant to organics	formaldehyde, hydrogen sulfide, other sulfur-containing gases
Cellulose acetate	yellowed, brittle	hydrolysis produces acetic acid oily plasticized liquids. White powder residue may also be visible	dissolved swelled	acetic acid gas, oily plasticizer and degradation products on surface
Cellulose nitrate	yellowed, brittle	hydrolysis produces acidic and oxidizing nitrogen oxide gases	dissolved, swelled	acidic and oxidizing nitrogen oxide gases, plasticizer, and degradation products on surface; material is explosively flammable
Nylon (polyamide)	yellowed, brittle	potential hydrolysis at extreme conditions	softened, swelled	none
Phenolics (phenol formaldehyde)	discolored and more matte	discolored and more matte	fillers swell and surface mottles with solvents	phenol and formaldehyde with severe degradation
Polyolefin (polyethylene, polypropylene)	yellowed, brittle	resistant	swollen by some organics	none
Polystyrene	yellowed, brittled	resistant	dissolved, swelled, stress cracked	none
Polyurethane	yellowed, brittle, sticky, crumbles	yellowed, brittle, sticky, crumbles	swelled, stress cracked	nitrogenous organic gases and liquids
Polyvinyl chloride	yellowed, brittle	resistant	dissolved, swelled, embrittled by plasticizer extraction	oily plasticizer liquids, maybe hydrochloric acid gas under extreme conditions of moisture and light exposure
Rubber, ebonite, vulcanite	brittle, discolored, increase in matteness	hydrogen sulfide and other gases, sulfuric acid on surfaces	surface mottled by solvents	hydrogen sulfide and other sulfur-containing gases, sulfuric acid on surfaces
All plastics (and organics)	should be considered as prone to damage by ultraviolet radiation usually resulting in yellowing and embrittlement	condensation plastics like esters, amides, and urethanes are subject to hydrolysis with subsequent weakening	thermoplastics may dissolve, thermosets may swell, stress cracking	harmful gases from plastics with chlorine, sulfur, and pendant (not main chain) ester groups

Additional effects of deterioration:

Plastics composed of cellulose acetate, when exposed to water, often will give off a smell of vinegar (vinegar syndrome); the surface will have a white powder residue and will begin to shrink.

Cellulose acetate butyrate (CAB) and cellulose butyrate will produce butyric acid which has a "vomit odor".

Polyvinyl chloride may cause a "blooming" effect, white powder on the surface that can contaminate nearby materials.

== Preventive care ==
A yearly checkup of plastic artifacts can help monitor their condition, as well as the condition of the surrounding objects to verify that they have not been cross-contaminated.

=== Safe handling ===
Impermeable safety gloves such as those made of nitrile can help prevent toxins from entering the skin when handling plastic objects. Dust masks, respirators, or other personal protective equipment may be required for protection from outgassing or airborne microplastic dusts produced by some decaying plastics.

=== Storage environment ===
Plastics are best stored with a relative humidity level of 50%, at a storage temperature of 18 °C (64 °F), in light-proof enclosures. Because the composition of each plastic material can be different, it is difficult to designate a single uniform storage care plan; understanding the specific composition of a plastic artifact can help determine its preferred climate conditions. Keeping plastics at a stable low temperature and placing these objects either in cold storage or in oxygen-impermeable bags helps to slow degradation.

Monitoring plastics in their storage environment is done by tracking their status and condition by using log entries on spreadsheets or in another database. Monitoring the temperature environment is done using data logger hardware which tracks hourly changes in temperature (and optionally, humidity). Objects composed of flammable and unstable cellulose nitrate especially benefit from cold storage, to reduce their rate of decay.

=== Long-term storage supplies ===
Adsorbents such as activated carbon, silica gel, and zeolites are used to absorb gases that are released from plastics. These absorbents can also be used when the object is on display to prevent and off-gassing that could occur, whether the object is on exhibit or in long-term storage. Absorbents along with acid-free boxes can help slow down the process of degradation and vinegar syndrome which is common in certain types of film, Lego plastics, and artwork.

Oxygen-impermeable bags are used to exclude atmospheric oxygen. In combination with oxygen absorbers, this prevents oxidation and deterioration of the contents.

== Conservation ==
The process of conservation and restoration of plastics requires an understanding of chemical composition of the material and an appreciation for the possible methods of restoration and their limitations, as well as development of a post-treatment preventive care plan for the object.

=== Cleaning ===
The process of cleaning plastics is done with the use of appropriate solvents, after identifying the polymers that make up the composition of the plastic. A spot test can be performed if there is uncertainty how the object will react to water or solvents.

=== Scratch removal ===
Within the field of contemporary art, where the surface finish is part of the artist's intent, the removal of scratches may need to be more nuanced, compared to simply compensating for accidental damage to social-historical artifacts. Conservators have developed and scientifically investigated a variety of methods for scratch removal.

=== Filling ===
Fillings may be needed if an object has suffered considerable loss of material due to accidental damage or chemical deterioration. The process of filling depends on the object's chemical composition, and requires consideration of refractive indexes, transparency, viscosity, and its compatibility with the rest of the object.

== See also ==
- Disc rot
