= Trimethylolethane trinitrate =

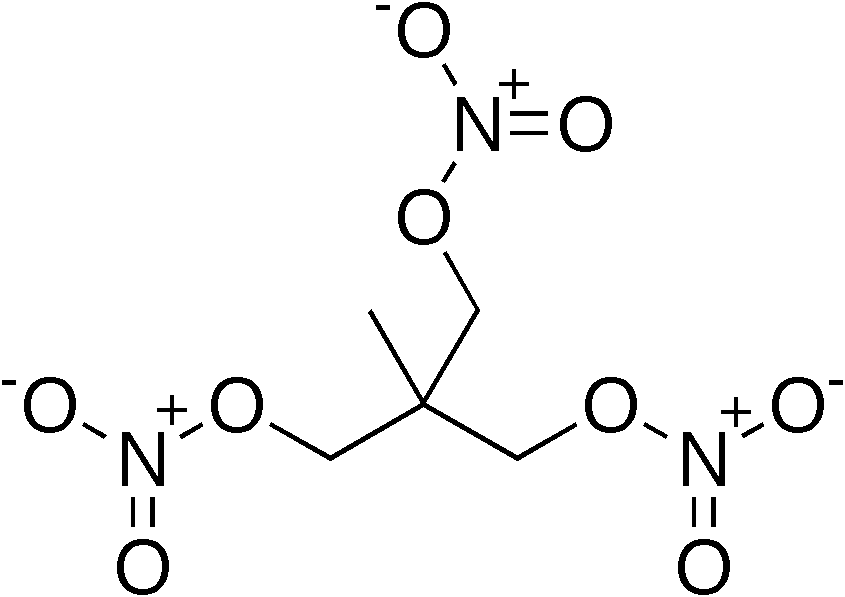

Names
- IUPAC name [2-methyl-3-nitrooxy-2-(nitrooxymethyl)propyl] nitrate
- Other names TMETN; Metriol trinitrate; METN; Nitropentaglycerin; 1,1,1-trimethylolethane trinitrate

Identifiers
CAS Number	3032-55-1
3D model (JSmol)	Interactive image
ChemSpider	68895
ECHA InfoCard	100.019.287
PubChem CID	76423
UNII	HMJ3NEC9W7
CompTox Dashboard (EPA)	DTXSID7051979
- InChI: InChI=1S/C5H9N3O9/c1-5(2-15-6(9)10,3-16-7(11)12)4-17-8(13)14/h2-4H2,1H3 Key: IPPYBNCEPZCLNI-UHFFFAOYSA-N
- SMILES: CC(CO[N+]([O-])=O)(CO[N+]([O-])=O)CO[N+]([O-])=O

Properties
Chemical formula	C_{5}H_{9}N_{3}O_{9}
Molar mass	255.14
Density	1.47 g/cm^{3}
Melting point	−3 °C (27 °F; 270 K)
Boiling point	decomposes at 182 °C (360 °F; 455 K)

Hazards
Flash point	26.7 °C (80.1 °F; 299.8 K)
- Except where otherwise noted, data are given for materials in their standard state (at 25 °C [77 °F], 100 kPa). verify (what is ?) Infobox references

Trimethylolethane trinitrate (TMETN), also known as metriol trinitrate (METN, MTN, METRTN) or nitropentaglycerin, is a nitrate ester. It is a high explosive similar to nitroglycerin. It is a transparent oily liquid, colorless to light brown. It is odorless. It is used in some solid propellants and smokeless powders as a plasticizer. Its chemical formula is CH_{3}−C(CH_{2}−O−NO_{2})_{3}.

TMETN was first prepared and patented in Italy under name Metriolo. Germans began producing it before World War II, when it was demonstrated to be an erosion and flash-reducing agent in smokeless powders. It is a liquid explosive with properties similar to nitroglycerin, but more stable to heat. It is prepared by nitration of trimethylolethane (metriol). It does not induce headaches.

TMETN can be initiated by friction, impact, and electrostatic discharge. It can be used as a high-viscosity plasticizer-binder together with nitrocellulose, but its poor colloidal properties has made such use rare. Long-term milling can however assist here; success can also be achieved by adding an inert plasticizer and a volatile solvent/colloidal agent.

TMETN is miscible with ether and acetone. It is insoluble in 95% sulfuric acid. It can be used as a plasticizer together with, or as an alternative to, triethyleneglycol dinitrate (TEGDN). It can also be used as a monopropellant; in fact, triethylene glycol dinitrate, diethylene glycol dinitrate, and trimethyloleate trinitrate are being considered as replacements for nitroglycerin in propellants.
