= Yannis Bakos =

American economist

Yannis Bakos is a professor at the Leonard N. Stern School of Business at New York University. His primary area of expertise is the economic and business implications of information technology, the Internet, and online media. He is the co-founder (with Chris F. Kemerer) of the Workshop on Information Systems and Economics (WISE), and the co-inventor of Flexplay DVDs.

== Early life ==
Bakos holds a Ph.D. in Management and an MBA in Finance from the MIT Sloan School of Management. He also received a master's degree in Electrical Engineering and Computer Science and a B.S. in Computer Engineering from MIT's Department of Electrical Engineering and Computer Science. Before coming to NYU, Professor Bakos was on the faculty of the Merage School of Business at the University of California, Irvine and the Sloan School of Management at MIT.

== Career ==
Bakos' early work showed that the internet would reduce the search costs of buyers and sellers, and that the resulting electronic marketplaces would result in lower prices and more competition among the sellers. He has more recently studied pricing strategies for information. For example, his work with Erik Brynjolfsson showed that Product bundling can be particularly effective for "digital information goods" with very low or zero marginal cost.^{1} In other recent work, he has been studying how reputation mechanisms, like the ones used by eBay, offer an alternative to traditional litigation as a way to settle disputes.

Bakos is the co-inventor of Flexplay DVDs, which are limited play DVDs that expire a preset period after the package is opened. Expiration is triggered when a special chemical layer in the DVD is exposed to oxygen in the air, and thus does not depend on the electronics of the DVD player. This invention received several U.S. and international patents. Dr. Bakos co-founded Flexplay Technologies, where he was chairman of the board from 2001 until the company was sold to the Convex Group in 2004. Disney released about 100 movies in the U.S. using this technology under the ez-D trade name, and the technology was used in Japan until 2010.

== Notes ==
- ^1 See Bundling and Competition on the Internet and Bundling Information Goods: Pricing, Profits and Efficiency by Yannis Bakos and Erik Brynjolfsson.
