= Servowriter =

Machine used for manufacturing hard drives

A servowriter or disk writer or servo writer or servo track writer or STW is a complex machine used in the manufacturing of a hard disk drive. It can write servo tracks (a circular string of sector marks) with much greater precision than a disk drive can. This is due to the big motors, sensors and cooling systems that would be too bulky and expensive to build into a disk drive. The servowriter writes the tracks on the raw media in the factory before the media is assembled into the disk drive. The assembled disk drive can follow the precise tracks, even though it is not capable of writing them. Once the read/write head has found the proper track, it can read and write data between the sector marks on the track.

A servowriter is used to write servo tracks on the disk platters which make up part of the servomechanism that positions the actuator arm.

A servowriter can be split in three major parts:

1. An accurate spindle that will set a perfect speed to help the head to fly on the surface and the right frequency to write the data.
2. An actuator with precise positioning system to write the servo information on a perfect circle with a width of less than a micrometer.
3. An electronic part that will write the servo information at the right frequency.

The head needs to fly on the electromagnetic surface of the disk to place the spin up or down. The gap in the magnet will read or write using the Laplace Force FL = idl^B
