= Data auditing =

Data auditing is the process of conducting a data audit to assess how company's data is fit for given purpose. This involves profiling the data and assessing the impact of poor quality data on the organization's performance and profits. It can include the determination of the clarity of the data sources and can be applied in the way banks and rating agencies perform due diligence with regard to the treatment of raw data given by firms, particularly the identification of faulty data.

Data auditing can also refer to the audit of a system to determine its efficacy in performing its function. For instance, it can entail the evaluation of the information systems of the IT departments to determine whether they are effective in protecting the integrity of critical data. As an auditing tool, it can detect fraud, intrusions, and other security problems.
