= Compact disc bronzing =

Type of compact disc corrosion

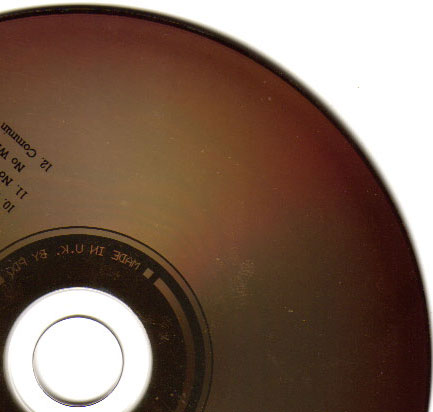
CD affected by bronzing

Compact disc bronzing, or CD bronzing, is a specific, uncommon variant of disc rot, a type of corrosion that affects the reflective layer of compact discs and renders them unreadable over time. The phenomenon was first reported by John McKelvey in the September/October 1994 issue of American Record Guide.

Affected discs show an uneven brownish discolouring that usually starts at the edge of the disc and slowly works its way toward the center. The top or label layer is affected before the bottom layer. The disc becomes progressively darker over time; tracks at the end of the disc (near the outer edge) show an increasing number of disc-read errors before becoming unplayable.

CD bronzing seems to occur mostly with audio CDs manufactured by Philips and Dupont Optical (PDO) at its plant in Blackburn, Lancashire, UK, between the years 1988 and 1993. Most, but not all, of these discs have "Made in U.K. by PDO" etched into them (see image). Discs manufactured by PDO in other countries do not seem to be affected. A similar, if considerably less widespread problem occurred with discs manufactured by Optical Media Storage (Opti.Me.S) in Italy.

PDO acknowledged that the problem was due to a manufacturing error on its part, but it gave different explanations for the problem. The most widely acknowledged explanation is that the lacquer used to coat the discs was not resistant to the sulfur content of the paper in the booklets, which led to the corrosion of the aluminium layer of the disc, even though PDO later said it was because "a silver coating had been used on its discs instead of the standard gold." Peter Copeland of the British Library Sound Archive confirmed that silver instead of aluminium in the reflective layer of the CD would react with sulfur compounds in the sleeves, forming silver sulfate, which has a bronze colour. A combination of the two factors seems likely because, as Barbara Hirsch of the University of California points out, the oxidation could only have occurred if the protective lacquer did not seal the metal film and substrate well enough.

There are also isolated reports of CD discolouring with discs from other pressing plants, but these do not seem to be as widespread and may be due to reasons other than the manufacturing error that occurred at PDO. In particular, colour changes that occur along with the visible disintegration of the data layer (i.e. holes) are not typical of CD bronzing, but should be considered CD rot.

PDO also manufactured CDs that have an even yellowish-golden tint. This is due to a yellow dye in the disc and is unrelated to the bronzing effect.

As bronzing is a progressive effect that cannot be stopped, any PDO- or Opti.Me.S-manufactured CDs that are not yet showing any signs of bronzing by now are very likely safe.

== Affected record labels ==
At the time, PDO was contracted by several record companies, many of whose records may be affected. According to a list compiled on Classical.net and other sources, these include Ace Records, Albany Records, Appian Records, APR, Archiv Produktion, ASV Records, Baseline Records, Cala, Chapter 22 Records, Collins Classics, CRD Records, Danacords, Decca, Deutsche Grammophon, Globe Style, Hyperion Records, IMP records, L'Oiseau-Lyre, London Records, Memoir Records, Pearl Records, RPO Records, Testament Records and Unicorn-Kanchana.

== Preventing bronzing ==
Bronzing is due to a fault in the manufacturing process and can therefore neither be prevented nor be stopped once it has begun.

However, storage conditions certainly seem to contribute to the speed of the decay, as some bronzed CDs were already reported as unreadable in the mid-1990s, whereas others were still playable as recently as 2012. As it was noted that CDs stored in paper sleeves were deteriorating sooner and faster than CDs stored in jewel cases, it is likely that storing CDs in an acid-free environment might slow down the bronzing effect. A minimum measure would be to remove the booklet and paper inlay from the CD's jewel case, though it might be advisable to store affected CDs in envelopes made of alkaline paper inside a box made of acid-free cardboard. Plastic or vinyl sleeves are not considered safe because the softening agents in the plastic may lead to further corrosion; polypropylene sleeves are a notable safe exception. Similar measures are used for books suffering from acid deterioration.

Because the recording is in the polycarbonate, not the reflective layer, the IASA has pointed out that in principle it would be possible to split the sandwich and re-coat the polycarbonate with aluminium to conserve the data on the disc.

== Customer support policy ==
When the problem became known in the early 1990s, PDO offered to replace any discs thus affected if supplied with the defective disc and proof of purchase, and pledged to re-press new CDs until the year 2015 if a customer notices the corrosion problem. However, after a change of ownership, PDO (now EDC – Entertainment Distribution Company) discontinued its helpline in 2006, and defective CDs are now no longer replaced by the manufacturer, even though some of the affected record labels continue to offer replacement compact discs.
