= Epoxidized soybean oil =

Names
- Other names ESBO; Epoxidized soya bean oil; ESO

Identifiers
| CAS Number | 8013-07-8 |
| ChemSpider | none |
| ECHA InfoCard | 100.029.444 |
| EC Number | 232-391-0 |
| CompTox Dashboard (EPA) | DTXSID1027687 |

Properties
| Appearance | Light yellow viscous liquid |
| Density | 0.994 g/cm^{3} |
| Melting point | 0 °C (32 °F; 273 K) |
| Solubility in water | Insoluble |

Hazards
| NFPA 704 (fire diamond) | 1 1 0 |
| Flash point | 227 °C (441 °F; 500 K) |
| Autoignition temperature | 600 °C (1,112 °F; 873 K) |
- Except where otherwise noted, data are given for materials in their standard state (at 25 °C [77 °F], 100 kPa). verify (what is ?) Infobox references

Epoxidized soybean oil (ESBO) is a collection of organic compounds obtained from the epoxidation of soybean oil. It is used as a plasticizer and stabilizer in polyvinyl chloride (PVC) plastics. ESBO is a yellowish viscous liquid.

== Manufacturing process ==
Epoxidized linolein, a major component of ESBO.

ESBO is manufactured from soybean oil through the process of epoxidation. Polyunsaturated vegetable oils are widely used as precursors to epoxidized oil products because they have high numbers of carbon-carbon double bonds available for epoxidation. The epoxide group is more reactive than double bond, thus providing a more energetically favorable site for reaction and making the oil a good hydrochloric acid scavenger and plasticizer. Usually a peroxide or a peracid is used to add an atom of oxygen and convert the -C=C- bond to an epoxide group.

== Uses ==
Food products that are stored in glass jars are usually sealed with gaskets made from PVC. ESBO is one of the additives in the PVC gasket. It serves as a plasticizer and a scavenger for hydrochloric acid released when the PVC degrades thermally, e.g. when the gasket is applied to the lid and food product undergoes sterilization. ESBO is also used in PVC cling films for wrapping foods and toys.

== Safety ==
=== Food ===
A Swiss survey in June 2005 showed that (among many other plasticizers exceeding the legal limits) migration of ESBO into foods reached up to 1,170 mg/kg. Rapid Alert System in Food and Feed (RASFF) had also reported cases of food product rejection in EU for exceeding specific migration limit (SML) under EU Legislation (EC/2002/72). Enforcement authorities took measures to force producers respecting the legal limits.

=== Legislation ===
In Europe, plastics in food contact are regulated by Regulation (EU) 10/2011. It establishes a SML for ESBO of 60 mg/kg. However, in the case of PVC gaskets used to seal glass jars containing infant formulae and follow-on formulae as defined by Directive 2006/141/EC or processed cereal-based foods and baby foods for infants and young children as defined by Directive 2006/125/EC, the SML is lowered to 30 mg/kg. This is because babies have higher food consumption per body weight.

=== Toxicity ===
The tolerable daily intake (TDI) of ESBO defined by the Scientific Committee on Food (SCF) of the EU is 1 mg/kg body weight. This value is based on a toxicological assessment performed by the British Industrial Biological Research Association (BIBRA) in the late 1997. Repeated oral administration had been shown to affect the liver, kidney, testis and uterus of rats. According to the conventional European rules for food packaging materials, the TDI became a basis for the SML of 60 mg/kg.

== See also ==
- Food safety
