= Flexplay =

Discontinued optical video disc format

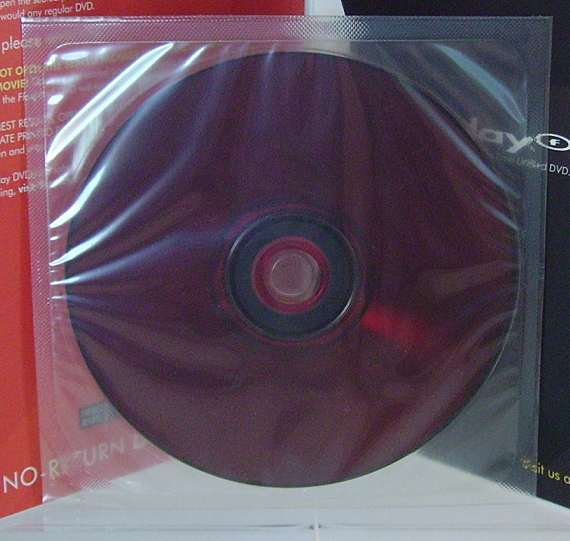
- A sealed Flexplay disc
- Media type: optical disc
- Capacity: 4.7 GB (single layer), 8.5 GB (dual layer)
- Usage: Rental videos
- Extended from: DVD
- Released: August 2003
- Discontinued: April 2011

Flexplay is a trademark for a discontinued DVD-compatible optical video disc format with a time-limited (usually 48-hour) playback. They are often described as "self-destructing", although the disc merely turns black or dark red and does not physically disintegrate. The technology launched in August 2003 as a joint-venture with Disney's Buena Vista Home Entertainment under the name eZ-D. The Flexplay concept was invented by two professors, Yannis Bakos and Erik Brynjolfsson, who founded Flexplay Technologies in 1999. The technology was developed by Flexplay Technologies and General Electric.

== Origins ==
The technology was originally intended as an alternative means for the short-term rental of newly released movies. Since the disc is capable of being used in any standard DVD player, the manufacturers hoped that it would succeed where other time-limited DVD technologies, such as DIVX, failed. Test marketing of eZ-D discs began in August 2003, but was canceled early when consumers rejected the concept. Owing to fears of cannibalizing DVD sales, movies were made available on eZ-D between 2 months and several years after being released on DVD and were priced at US$6.99, both factors that significantly limited consumer demand.

SpectraDisc was another such technology, and on January 13, 2003, Flexplay Technologies acquired all of the SpectraDisc Corporation assets. SpectraDisc discs worked in a similar way as Flexplay discs, only not starting as red and turning blue instead of black.

== Specifications ==
Flexplay discs do not bear the DVD logo. When asked whether Flexplay discs do or do not comply with DVD forum standards, a company spokesperson replied that "Flexplay DVDs are produced to be readable in DVD players adhering to DVD Forum specifications."

A Flexplay disc is shipped in a vacuum-sealed package. There is a clear dye inside the disc, contained within the bonding resin of the disc, which reacts with oxygen. When the seal is broken on the vacuum-packed disc, the layer changes from clear to black in about 48 hours, rendering the disc unplayable. If unopened, the shelf life of the sealed package is said to be "about a year". The DVD plastic also has a red dye in it, which prevents penetration of the disc by blue lasers, which would go straight through the oxygen-reactive dye.

The Flexplay discs are dual-layer DVD-9 discs. The difference with standard DVDs is the composition of the resin adhesive holding the inner and outer layer together, which is sensitive to oxygen and darkens within a pre-set time, usually 48 hours, when exposed to air. The replacement of the adhesive results in only minimal altering to the DVD manufacturing process. The time of the darkening can be influenced by varying the exact composition of the resin. For the DVD-5 discs, where there is no layer of bonding resin in the optical path, a surface coating can be used.

According to the vendor, "Flexplay discs are fully recyclable and conform to all applicable EPA environmental standards." Some environmental groups have endorsed the product due to Flexplay's recycling plans and partnership with environmental industry leaders such as GreenDisk, leading to the creation of the first DVD recycling operation. Others such as the Grass Roots Recycling Network nevertheless have objected to the creation of a short-lived "disposable" version of a traditionally durable product.

== Chemistry ==
The reactive layer contains a polymer resin that acts as a carrier for a suitable leuco dye, which, upon contact with atmospheric oxygen, oxidizes to form an opaque or semi-opaque material.

Some of the dyes used are methylene blue, prussian blue, brilliant cresyl blue, toluidine blue, Basic Blue 3, methylene green, Taylor's blue, Janus Green B, Meldola's blue, thionin, Nile blue, and celestine blue. The leuco dye is prepared by chemical reduction using a suitable reducing agent. The method commercially used by Flexplay and SpectraDisc employs methylene blue reduced by sodium dithionite.

In order to prevent the oxidation from being triggered during manufacture of the discs, and in order to avoid the need for manufacturing in an inert atmosphere, the leuco dyes are further chemically modified to their blocked forms. Such blocked leuco dyes are the leuco dye precursors that form the leuco dye by a slow, controlled chemical reaction. Leucomethylene blue can be reacted with triisopropylsilyl trifluoromethanesulfonate, forming triisopropylsilyloxycarbonylleucomethylene blue (TIPSOCLMB), which is stable in presence of air oxygen. In presence of nucleophile reagents, e.g. water, the blocked leuco dye compound undergoes hydrolysis, releasing the unblocked leuco dye. This reaction is slow (several days to a week), and the hydrolytic compound is supplied either as atmospheric moisture, or in the formulation of the resin.

The rate of the deblocked leuco dye oxidation is dependent on the pH of the resin polymer matrix. By adding basic compounds (for example, 1,4-diazabicyclo[2.2.2] octane (DABCO), or other amines), the pH is increased, and the reaction rate increases correspondingly. Correspondingly, by adding strong protic acids (for example, camphorsulfonic acid), the reaction rate can be decreased and the lifetime of the disc prolonged.

The residual oxygen can be removed from the substrates used for disc manufacture by storing them under a vacuum or oxygen free atmosphere (e.g. pure nitrogen) for a period of time (hours to days). Alternatively, an oxygen scavenger (e.g. iron(II) salts, tin(II) salts, or organometallic compounds) can be added to the polymer formulation, reacting with the oxygen present in the polymer matrix in shorter timeframe than the hydrolysis of the blocked leuco dye takes.

The reaction timing can be further controlled by addition of other substances. As the diffusion rate of oxygen through the polymer layer is more or less constant, a supply of suitable antioxidants (e.g. organometallic compounds) which react with the oxygen preferentially to the leuco dye leads to gradual depletion of the antioxidant compound. Only after the antioxidant is consumed, the leuco dye starts being oxidized, achieving the period of delay of the reaction onset, followed by a rapid reflectivity degradation. Stannous ethylhexanoate can be used here as the antioxidant organometallic. Various resin-soluble tin(II) and iron(II) compounds can be used, e.g. chelates and fatty acid salts. Other usable compounds are e.g. hydroquinones, alkylhydroxylamines, dithionates, reducing saccharides (e.g. glucose), α-hydroxyketones (e.g., hydroxyacetone), substituted boron hydrides and silicon hydrides.

The oxidized dyes in the expired discs absorb primarily at the wavelength of the current diode lasers (red, 650 nm) used in the DVD players. However, the new generation of DVDs is designed to use blue lasers at 450-460 or even 405 nm, for which the methylene blue is essentially transparent. While SpectraDisc did not take this in account, the Flexplay discs incorporate a red color filter, blocking blue lasers from reading the disc, expired or not. Acridine Yellow can be used for this purpose, together with 9,10-bis(phenylethynyl)anthracene, and a scale of different azo dyes, aromatic hydrocarbons, and other dyes. The dyes can be added directly to the polycarbonate resin the discs are made of.

Additionally, other methods of the disc degradation are proposed to be deployed together with the primary one; the concern of the technology developers here is that while the dye oxidation mechanism prevents the disc from being read by current consumer technologies, the information on the disc, recorded in the pattern of the pits in the reflective layer, remains intact and could be recovered. One of the methods is to make the two reflective layers in the DVD-9 disc of different metals (e.g. aluminium and silver), and separate them with an ionic conductor separator. The atmospheric oxygen then undergoes electrochemical reaction in such crude fuel cell with the silver as cathode and aluminum as anode, leading to growth of dendritic silver through the dielectric layer. When the silver reaches the aluminium, an electric short circuit forms, and galvanic corrosion then rapidly degrades the reflective layers. Many other mechanisms are proposed for this slower, less controlled "backup" method of data destruction, ranging from corrosion of the reflective layers to degradation of the polymer matrix of the disc itself.

== Releases ==
The Disney organization announced in 2003 that it would issue some releases on Flexplay ez-D discs (Pirates of the Caribbean: The Curse of the Black Pearl, Bridget Jones' Diary, The Recruit, Rabbit-Proof Fence, The Hot Chick, 25th Hour, Heaven, Equilibrium, Frida and Signs).

Discs were test-marketed in Austin, Texas. One grocery chain dropped the discs in February 2004, saying "It didn't turn out to be an item that our customers were looking for."

In 2004, Flexplay was purchased by The Convex Group who also own the Lidrock and HowStuffWorks brands. Flexplay discs were priced at around US$4.99, a price comparable to that of a two-day DVD rental.

The first Flexplay disc to receive national consumer distribution in the U.S. was a 2004 Christmas movie entitled Noel, which was released "trimultaneously" to theatres, to cable TV, and to Flexplay disc. Reportedly theatres were angered at the simultaneous release, and as a result the movie actually received screenings in only a few dozen theatres.

In June 2008, Flexplay announced that Staples would be selling Flexplay discs in their retail stores.

== See also ==
- Planned obsolescence
- DIVX and DVD-D, other disposable disc formats
- Disc rot, the unintended decay of optical discs due to physical or chemical deterioration
