= Plasticizer =

Substance added to a material to make it softer and more flexible

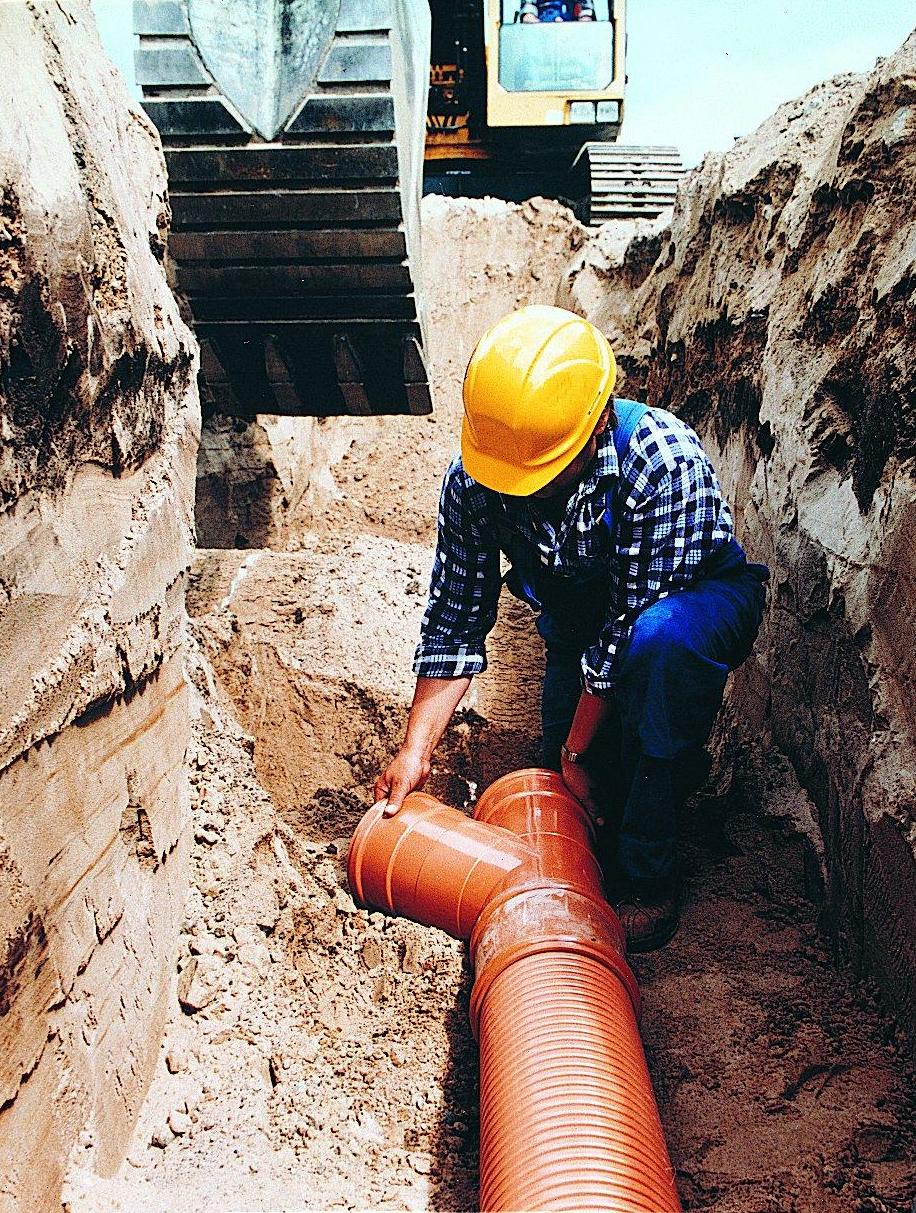
PVC, used extensively in sewage pipes, is only useful because of plasticizers.

A plasticizer (UK: plasticiser) is a substance that is added to a material to make it softer and more flexible, to increase its plasticity, to decrease its viscosity, and/or to decrease friction during its handling in manufacture.

Plasticizers are commonly added to polymers and plastics such as PVC, either to facilitate the handling of the raw material during fabrication, or to meet the demands of the end product's application. Plasticizers are especially key to the usability of polyvinyl chloride (PVC), the third most widely used plastic. In the absence of plasticizers, PVC is hard and brittle; with plasticizers, it is suitable for products such as vinyl siding, roofing, vinyl flooring, rain gutters, plumbing, and electric wire insulation/coating.

Plasticizers are also often added to concrete formulations to make them more workable and fluid for pouring, thus allowing the water contents to be reduced. Similarly, they are often added to clays, stucco, solid rocket fuel, and other pastes prior to molding and forming. For these applications, plasticizers largely overlap with dispersants.

== For polymers ==
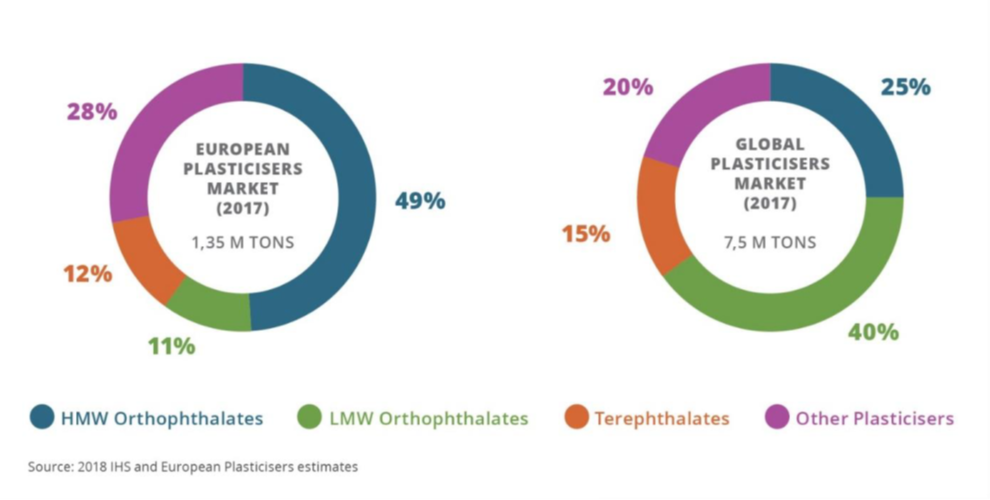
Europe's and Global Plasticiser Use by type 2017

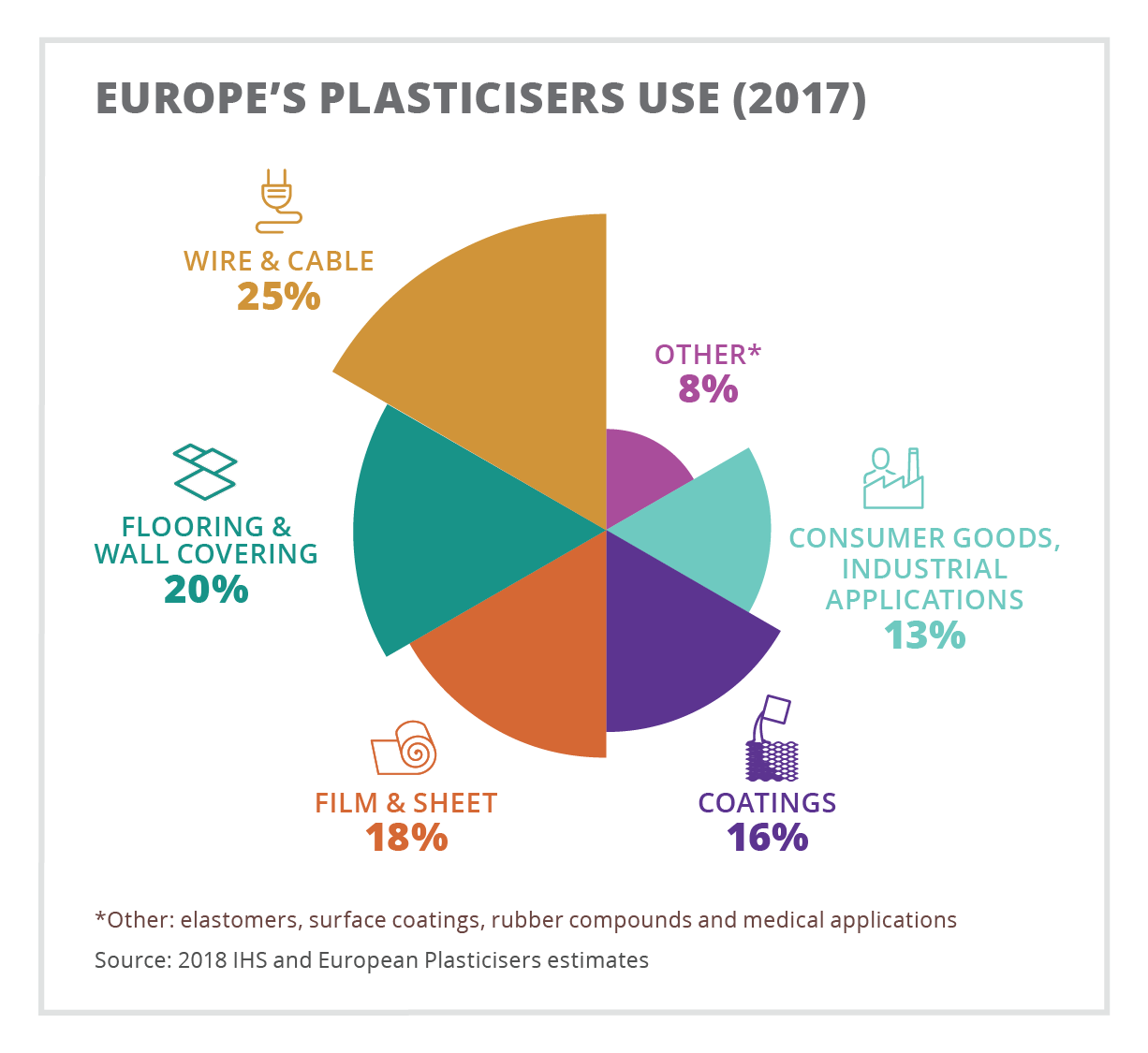
Europe's Plasticiser Use 2017

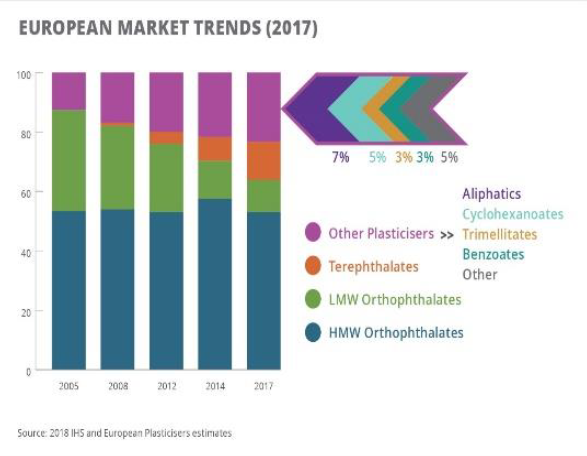
Europe's Plasticiser Market Trends 2017

Plasticizers for polymers are either solids or low-volatility liquids. According to 2017 data, the total global market for plasticizers was 7.5 million metric tonnes. In North America the 2017 volume was ~1.01 million metric tonnes and in Europe the figure was 1.35 million metric tonnes, split between various end-use applications with a chemical type trend moving to higher molecular weight (HMW) orthophthalates and alternative types following regulatory issues concerning lower molecular weight (LMW) orthophthalates.

Almost 90% of polymer plasticizers, most commonly phthalate esters, are used in PVC, giving this material improved flexibility and durability. Other polymers which can contain high loadings of plasticizers include acrylates and cellulose-type plastics, such as cellulose acetate, nitrocellulose and cellulose acetate butyrate.

=== Mechanism of action ===
The molecules of the plasticizer are immobilized within the matrix formed by the polymer, rather than being part of the polymer. It was commonly thought that plasticizers work by embedding themselves between the chains of polymers, spacing them apart (increasing the "free volume"), or swelling them and thus significantly lowering the glass transition temperature for the plastic and making it softer. It was later shown that the free volume explanation could not account for all of the effects of plasticization. The mobility of a polymer chain is more complex in the presence of plasticizer than what the Flory–Fox equation predicts for a simple polymer chain.

The molecules of plasticizer take control over mobility of the chain; a polymer chain does not show an increase of the free volume around polymer ends. If plasticizer/water creates hydrogen bonds with hydrophilic parts of the polymer, the associated free volume can be decreased.

The effect of plasticizers on elastic modulus is dependent on both temperature and plasticizer concentration. Below a certain concentration, referred to as the crossover concentration, a plasticizer can decrease the modulus of a material. The material's glass transition temperature will decrease, however, at all concentrations. In addition to a crossover concentration, a crossover temperature exists. Below the crossover temperature the plasticizer will also increase the modulus.

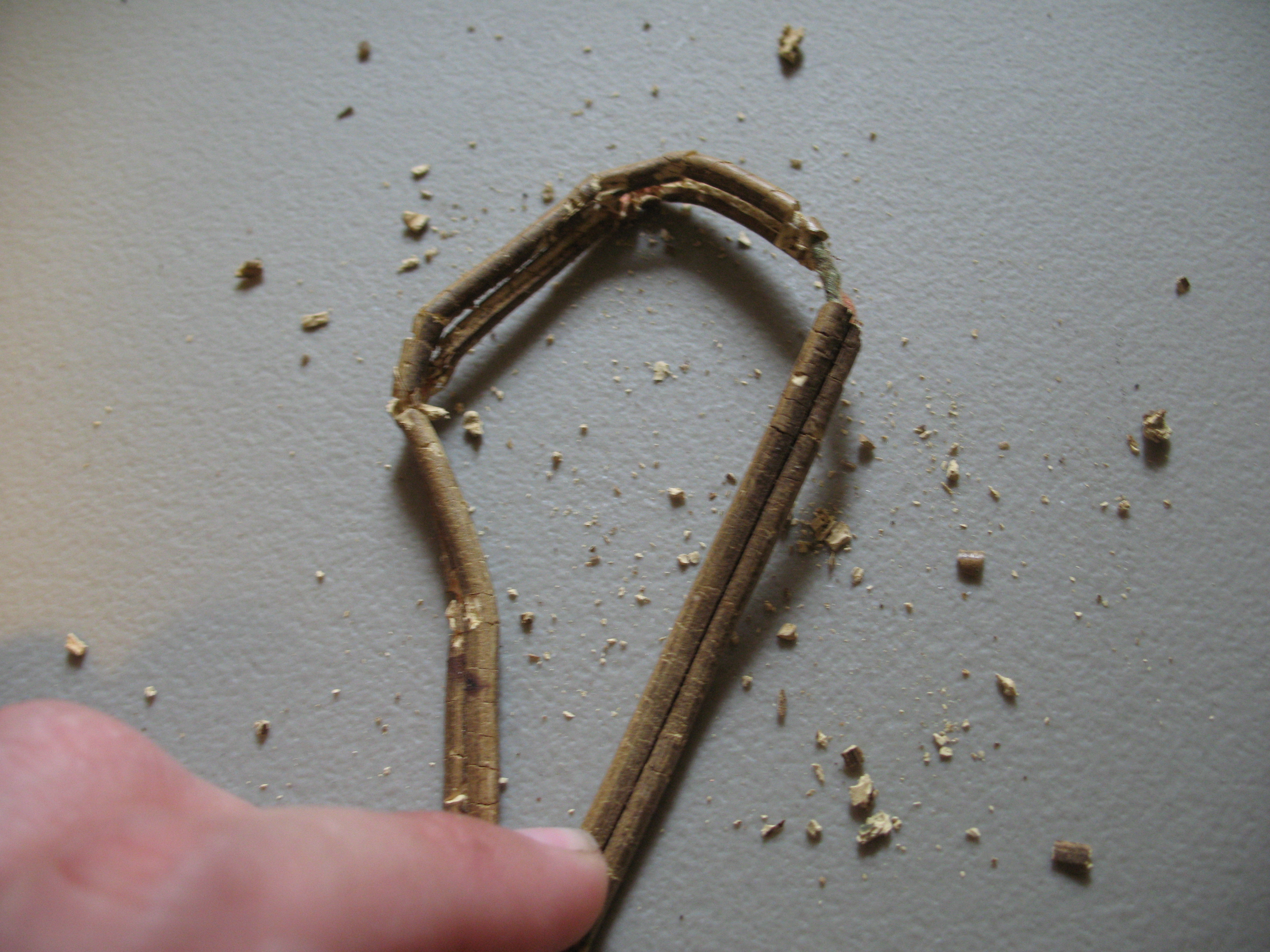
Migration of plasticizers out of their host plastics leads to loss of flexibility, embrittlement, and cracking. This decades-old plastic lamp cord crumbles when flexed, due to loss of the plasticizers.

=== Selection ===
Over the last 60 years more than 30,000 different substances have been evaluated for their suitability as polymer plasticizers. Of these, only a small number – approximately 50 – are today in commercial use.

Ester plasticizers are selected based upon cost-performance evaluation. The rubber compounder must evaluate ester plasticizers for compatibility, processibility, permanence and other performance properties. The wide variety of ester chemistries that are in production include sebacates, adipates, terephthalates, dibenzoates, glutarates, phthalates, azelates, and other specialty blends. This broad product line provides an array of performance benefits required for the many elastomer applications such as tubing and hose products, flooring, wall-coverings, seals and gaskets, belts, wire and cable, and print rolls.

Low to high polarity esters provide utility in a wide range of elastomers including nitrile, polychloroprene, EPDM, chlorinated polyethylene, and epichlorohydrin. Plasticizer-elastomer interaction is governed by many factors such as solubility parameter, molecular weight, and chemical structure. Compatibility and performance attributes are key factors in developing a rubber formulation for a particular application.

Plasticizers used in PVC and other plastics are often based on esters of polycarboxylic acids with linear or branched aliphatic alcohols of moderate chain length. These compounds are selected on the basis of many critieria including low toxicity, compatibility with the host material, nonvolatility, and expense. Phthalate esters of straight-chain and branched-chain alkyl alcohols meet these specifications and are common plasticizers. Ortho-phthalate esters have traditionally been the most dominant plasticizers, but regulatory concerns have led to the move away from classified substances to non-classified which includes high molecular weight ortho-phthalates and other plasticisers, especially in Europe.

=== Antiplasticizers ===
Antiplasticizers are polymer additives that have effect opposite to those of plasticizers. They increase the modulus while decreasing the glass transition temperature.

Bis(2-ethylhexyl) phthalate is a common plasticizer.

=== Safety and toxicity ===
Substantial concerns have been expressed over the safety of some polymer plasticizers, especially because some low molecular weight ortho-phthalates have been classified as potential endocrine disruptors with some developmental toxicity reported. Plasticizers can escape plastics due to migration and abrasion of the plastic since they are not bound to the polymer matrix. The "new car smell" is often attributed to plasticizers or their degradation products, however, multiple studies on the makeup of the smell do not find phthalates in appreciable amounts, likely due to their extremely low volatility and vapor pressure.

=== Common polymer plasticizers ===
==== Ortho phthalates ====
- Phthalate-based plasticizers are used in situations where good resistance to water and oils is required. Some common phthalate plasticizers are:
- Low Molecular Weight Ortho Phthalates
  - Dimethyl phthalate (DMP), used in fragrances, as an insect repellent, and in several industrial processes as a solvent/carrier
  - Diethyl phthalate (DEP), used in fragrances as a carrier and extender/fixative
  - Diisobutyl phthalate (DIBP)
  - Di-n-butyl phthalate (DBP), used for cellulose plastics, food wraps, adhesives, perfumes, and cosmetics - about a third of nail polishes, glosses, enamels, and hardeners contain it, together with some shampoos, sunscreens, skin emollients, and insect repellents
  - Butyl benzyl phthalate (benzyl butyl phthalate, BBzP) is found in vinyl tiles, traffic cones, food conveyor belts, artificial leather, and plastic foams
  - Bis(2-ethylhexyl) phthalate (DEHP) also commonly known as (dioctyl phthalate, DOP or diethylhexyl phthalate), historically used in flooring materials, medical devices, myriad consumer products, and high explosives, such as Semtex. DEHP was the most common plasticizer for decades and still holds that title globally even as it has largely been replaced now with higher molecular weight phthalates and alternatives in the US and Europe
- High Molecular Weight Ortho Phthalates
  - Diisononyl phthalate (DINP), used in flooring materials, found in garden hoses, shoes, toys, and building materials
  - Bis(2-propylheptyl) phthalate (DPHP), used in cables, wires and roofing materials
  - Diisodecyl phthalate (DIDP), used for insulation of wires and cables, car undercoating, shoes, carpets, pool liners
  - Diisoundecyl phthalate (DIUP), used for insulation of wires and cables, car undercoating, shoes, carpets, pool liners. Good high temperature and outdoor weathering performance
  - Ditridecyl phthalate (DTDP) is the highest molecular weight phthalate plasticizer, providing greater performance at high temperature. It is the preferred plasticizer for automotive cable and wire application.

==== Terephthalates ====
- Terephthalates are isomeric with ortho phthalates but have proven to have cleaner toxicological results due to their inability to form stable monoesters during hydrolysis and metabolic breakdown.
  - Bis(2-ethylhexyl) terephthalate (DEHT; Dioctyl terephthalate, DOTP) (Eastman Chemical Company Trademark: Eastman 168™), used as a replacement for DEHP and DINP
  - Diisopentyl terephthalate (DiPT)(Evonik Industries Trademark: ELATUR® DPT), used as a replacement for DBP and DiBP
  - Dibutyl terephthalate (DBT)(Eastman Chemical Trademark: Eastman Effusion™), used as a replacement for DBP and DiBP

==== Trimellitates ====
- Trimellitates are used in automobile interiors and other applications where resistance to high temperature is required. They have extremely low volatility.
  - Tri(2-ethylhexyl)trimellitate (TEHTM) (TOTM, Trioctyl Trimellitate plasticizer)
  - Tri(isononyl)trimellitate (TINTM)
  - Tri(isodecyl)trimellitate (TIDTM)
  - Tri(isotridecyl)trimellitate (TITDTM)

==== Adipates & Sebacates ====
- Adipate-based plasticizers are used for low-temperature or resistance to ultraviolet light. An example is:
  - Bis(2-ethylhexyl)adipate (DEHA, dioctyl adipate plasticizer)
- Sebacate- based plasticizers provide excellent compatibility with a range of plastic materials and synthetic rubbers (specifically nitrile rubber and neoprene), superior properties at low temperatures, and good oil resistivity. Some examples are:
  - Dibutyl sebacate (DBS)
  - Di(2-ethylhexyl)sebacate, Di-octyl Sebacate (or DOS plasticizer)

==== Organophosphates ====
- Organophosphates include the following:
  - Tricresyl phosphate (TCP)
  - 2-Ethylhexyl diphenyl phosphate

==== Other ====
- 1,2-Cyclohexane dicarboxylic acid diisononyl ester (BASF Trademark: Hexamoll DINCH)
- Bis(2-ethylhexyl) cyclohexane-1,4-dicarboxylate (Hanwha Trademark: Eco-DEHCH)
- Alkyl sulphonic acid phenyl ester (ASE). (Lanxess Chemical Trademark: Mesamoll)
- Triethylene glycol di-2ethylhexanoate (Eastman Chemical Trademark: Eastman TEG-EH)

Bio-based plasticizers have been investigated, such as glycerol triacetate (Triacetin) and acetyltributylcitrate. They are used in niche applications. Epoxidized soybean oil is used broadly as a secondary plasticizer in many vinyl applications.

- Note: Bisphenol A, or BPA, is not a plasticizer, although it is often wrongly described as one.

== For inorganic materials ==
=== Concrete ===
In concrete technology, plasticizers are commonly referred to as water reducers, whereas superplasticizers are classified as high-range water reducers. Plasticizers typically provide water reductions of approximately 5–12%, while superplasticizers can achieve reductions exceeding 12%, often reaching 20–40% depending on admixture type and dosage. Under ASTM C494, conventional water-reducing admixtures are generally classified as Type A, whereas high-range water reducers are classified as Type F or Type G when retarding properties are also provided.Plasticizers are mainly used where moderate improvements in workability are required, whereas superplasticizers are employed in applications requiring low water-to-cement ratios and enhanced flowability. When added to concrete mixtures, they confer a number of properties including improved workability and strength. The strength of concrete is inversely proportional to the amount of water added, i.e., the water-cement (w/c) ratio. In order to produce stronger concrete, less water is added (without "starving" the mix), which makes the concrete mixture less workable and difficult to mix, necessitating the use of plasticizers, water reducers, superplasticizers, fluidizer or dispersants.

Plasticizers are also often used when pozzolanic ash is added to concrete to improve strength. This method of mix proportioning is especially popular when producing high-strength concrete and fiber-reinforced concrete.

Adding 1–2% plasticizer per unit weight of cement is usually sufficient. In some cases, the addition of plasticizer retards curing.

Plasticizers are commonly manufactured from lignosulfonates, a by-product from the paper industry. Superplasticizers have generally been manufactured from sulfonated naphthalene condensate or sulfonated melamine formaldehyde, although newer products based on polycarboxylic ethers are now available. Traditional lignosulfonate-based plasticisers, naphthalene and melamine sulfonate-based superplasticisers disperse the flocculated cement particles through a mechanism of electrostatic repulsion (see colloid). In normal plasticisers, the active substances are adsorbed on to the cement particles, giving them a negative charge, which leads to repulsion between particles. Lignin, naphthalene, and melamine sulfonate superplasticisers are organic polymers. The long molecules wrap themselves around the cement particles, giving them a highly negative charge so that they repel each other.

Polycarboxylate ether superplasticizer (PCE) or just polycarboxylate (PC), work differently from sulfonate-based superplasticizers, giving cement dispersion by steric stabilisation. This form of dispersion is more powerful in its effect and gives improved workability retention to the cementitious mix.

=== Stucco ===
Plasticizers can be added to wallboard stucco mixtures to improve workability. In order to reduce the energy consumed drying wallboard, less water is added, which makes the gypsum mixture very unworkable and difficult to mix, necessitating the use of plasticizers, water reducers, or dispersants. Some studies also show that too much lignosulfonate dispersant could result in a set-retarding effect. Data showed that amorphous crystal formations occurred that detracted from the mechanical needle-like crystal interaction in the core, preventing a stronger core. The sugars, chelating agents in lignosulfonates such as aldonic acids and extractive compounds are mainly responsible for set retardation. These low range water reducing dispersants are commonly manufactured from lignosulfonates, a by-product from the paper industry.

High range superplasticizers (dispersants) have generally been manufactured from sulfonated naphthalene condensate, although polycarboxylic ethers represent more modern alternatives. Both of these high range water reducers are used at 1/2 to 1/3 of the lignosulfonate types.

Traditional lignosulfonate and naphthalene sulfonate-based plasticisers disperse the flocculated gypsum particles through a mechanism of electrostatic repulsion (see Colloid). In normal plasticisers, the active substances are adsorbed on to the gypsum particles, giving them a negative charge, which leads to repulsion between particles. Lignin and naphthalene sulfonate plasticizers are organic polymers. The long molecules wrap themselves around the gypsum particles, giving them a highly negative charge so that they repel each other.

=== Energetic materials ===
Energetic material pyrotechnic compositions, especially solid rocket propellants and smokeless powders for guns, often employ plasticizers to improve physical properties of the propellant binder or of the overall propellant, to provide a secondary fuel, and ideally, to improve specific energy yield (e.g. specific impulse, energy yield per gram of propellant, or similar indices) of the propellant. An energetic plasticizer improves the physical properties of an energetic material while also increasing its specific energy yield. Energetic plasticizers are usually preferred to non-energetic plasticizers, especially for solid rocket propellants. Energetic plasticizers reduce the required mass of propellant, enabling a rocket vehicle to carry more payload or reach higher velocities than would otherwise be the case. However, safety or cost considerations may demand that non-energetic plasticizers be used, even in rocket propellants. The solid rocket propellant used to fuel the Space Shuttle solid rocket booster employs HTPB, a synthetic rubber, as a non-energetic secondary fuel.

==== Plasticizers for energetic materials ====
Here are some energetic plasticizers used in rocket propellants and smokeless powders:

- Nitroglycerine (NG, aka "nitro", glyceryl trinitrate)
- Butanetriol trinitrate (BTTN)
- Dinitrotoluene (DNT)
- Trimethylolethane trinitrate (TMETN, aka Metriol trinitrate, METN)
- Diethylene glycol dinitrate (DEGDN, less commonly DEGN)
- Triethylene glycol dinitrate (TEGDN, less commonly TEGN)
- Bis(2,2-dinitropropyl)formal (BDNPF)
- Bis(2,2-dinitropropyl)acetal (BDNPA)
- 2,2,2-Trinitroethyl 2-nitroxyethyl ether (TNEN)

Due to the secondary alcohol groups, NG and BTTN have relatively low thermal stability. TMETN, DEGDN, BDNPF, and BDNPA have relatively low energies. NG and DEGDN have relatively high vapor pressure.

== See also ==
- Conservation and restoration of plastic objects
