= Slava Epstein =

American academic, entrepreneur

- Occupations: Researcher, academic, entrepreneur.

Academic background
- Education: M.S., Marine Biology (1981); Ph.D., Microbial Ecology (1986); Moscow State University; Shirshov Institute of Oceanology

Academic work
- Institutions: Northeastern University
- Website: https://cos.northeastern.edu/people/slava-epstein-2/

Slava Epstein is an American academic of Soviet-Jewish origin, researcher and entrepreneur working in the field of Microbial ecology. He is currently a professor in the biology department of Northeastern University and co-founder of NovoBiotic Pharmaceuticals. As a researcher his most covered contribution is the development of the Isolation chip (iChip) and the discovery of a new antibiotic, Teixobactin. Epstein's research has been published in many leading scientific journals including Nature and Science.

== Early life ==
Slava Epstein was born in the Soviet Union in a Jewish family. As a kid he was fascinated with astronomy and dreamed of being a physicist, however due to strict Soviet anti-semitic quotas he was advised to switch to biology.

== Education ==
Slava Epstein received an M.S. in marine biology from Moscow State University in 1981 and PhD in microbial ecology from the Russian Academy of Sciences, Shirshov Institute of Oceanology in 1986. For his research he traveled to the White Sea to study protozoan organisms.

== Immigration to the United States ==
Epstein immigrated with his family from the Soviet Union in late 1980's. He first volunteered, then completed a postdoc at the University of Massachusetts, Boston. Since 1992, he has worked at Northeastern University, where he is a professor in the biology department.

== Career ==
His main field of research is microbial ecology along with cultivation and discovery of previously unculturable microorganisms. Along with Kim Lewis, he is credited with development of the Isolation Chip (iChip). He was on the team along with Kim Lewis that discovered a previously unknown antibiotic Teixobactin, by screening soil bacteria using novel cultivation methods, particularly by cultivating the Eleftheria terrae, the antibiotic-producing bacteria in soil, which is the organism's natural environment.

== Awards and honors ==
Foreign Policy Magazine Leading Global Thinkers 2015, along with Kim Lewis. For the discovery of antibiotic Taixobactin in a pile of dirt.

== Bibliography ==
- Epstein SS, ed. (2009). Uncultivated Microorganisms. Microbiology Monographs. Vol. 10. Springer. doi:10.1007/978-3-540-85465-4. ISBN 978-3-540-85464-7. S2CID 250023301.
