= Hydraulic fluid =

Medium to transfer power in hydraulic machinery

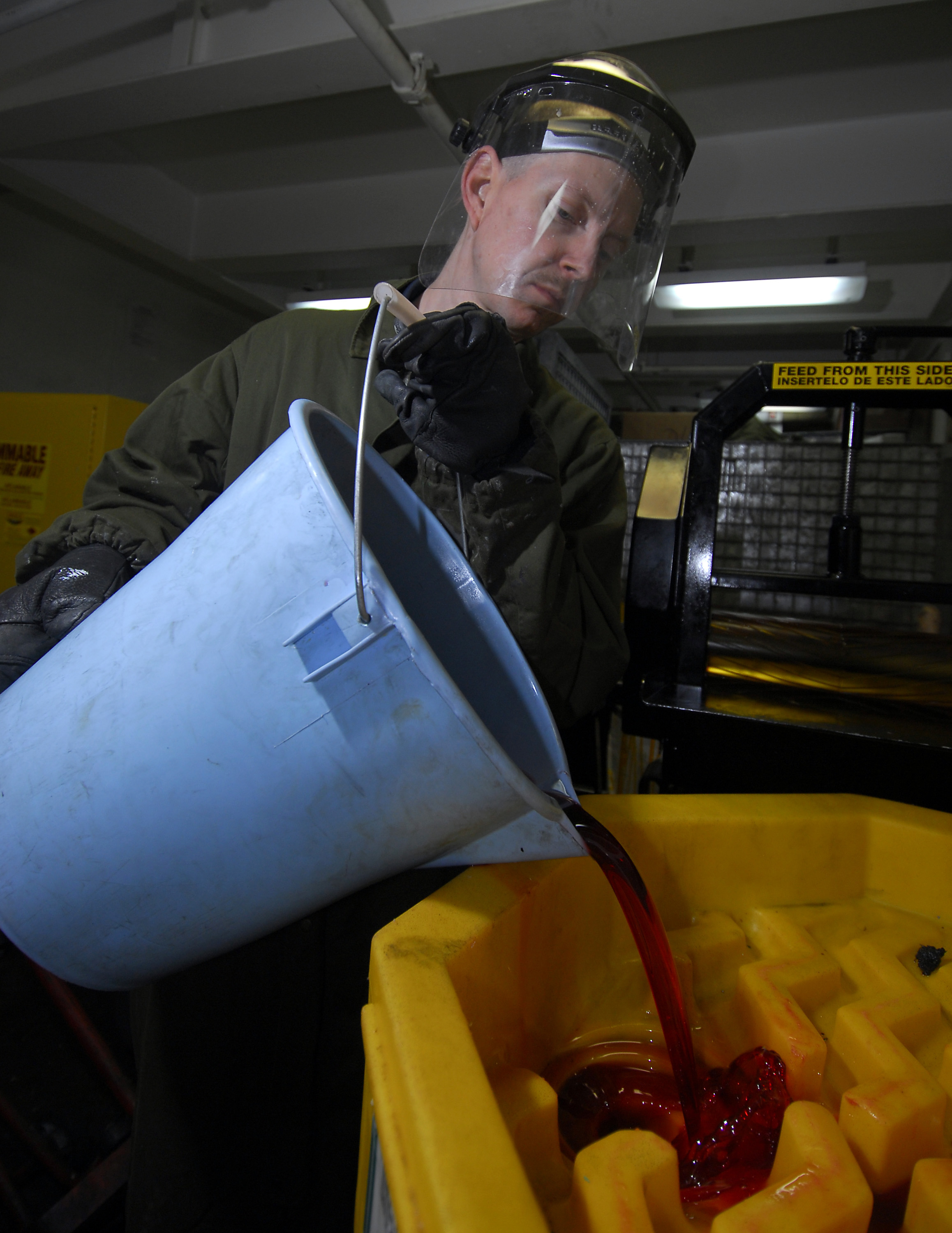
Hydraulic fluid being poured into a storage container

A hydraulic fluid or hydraulic liquid is the medium by which power is transferred in hydraulic machinery. Common hydraulic fluids are based on mineral oil or water. Examples of equipment that might use hydraulic fluids are excavators and backhoes, hydraulic brakes, power steering systems, automatic transmissions, garbage trucks, aircraft flight control systems, lifts, and industrial machinery.

Hydraulic systems like the ones mentioned above will work most efficiently if the hydraulic fluid used has zero compressibility.

== Functions and properties ==
The primary function of a hydraulic fluid is to convey power. In use, however, there are other important functions of hydraulic fluid such as protection of the hydraulic machine components. The table below lists the major functions of a hydraulic fluid and the properties of a fluid that affect its ability to perform that function:

Function	Property
Power transmission and control medium	Non compressible (high bulk modulus); Fast air release; Low foaming tendency; Low volatility
Medium for heat transfer	Good thermal capacity and conductivity
Sealing medium	Adequate viscosity and viscosity index; Shear stability
Lubricant	Viscosity for film maintenance; Low temperature fluidity; Thermal and oxidative stability; Hydrolytic stability / water tolerance; Cleanliness and filterability; Demulsibility; Antiwear characteristics; Corrosion control
Pump efficiency	Proper viscosity to minimize internal leakage; High viscosity index
Special function	Fire resistance; Friction modifications; Radiation resistance
Environmental impact	Low toxicity when new or decomposed; Biodegradability
Functioning life	Material compatibility

== Composition ==
=== Base stock ===
Although many liquids can be used, such as water, almost all hydraulic fluids are less corrosive and more viscous. The petrochemical mineral oil is the predominant component, the particular type being dictated by viscosity. Poly alpha olefins, which are petroleum-derived synthetic lubricating oils, are mixed with the mineral oil.

Other base stocks are used for specialty applications, such as for fire resistance and extreme temperature applications. Some examples include: glycol ethers, organophosphate ester, polyalphaolefin, propylene glycol, and silicone oils.

=== Other components ===
Hydraulic fluids can contain a wide range of additives as corrosion inhibitors (incl acid scavengers), anti-erosion additives, etc. Some of these compounds, including: oils, butanol, esters (e.g. phthalates, like DEHP, and adipates, like bis(2-ethylhexyl) adipate), polyalkylene glycols (PAG), organophosphate (e.g. tributylphosphate), silicones, alkylated aromatic hydrocarbons, polyalphaolefins (PAO) (e.g. polyisobutenes),

=== Niche hydraulic fluids ===
NaK-77, a eutectic alloy of sodium and potassium, can be used as a hydraulic fluid in high-temperature and high-radiation environments, for temperature ranges of 10 to 1,400 °F (−12 to 760 °C). Its bulk modulus at 1,000 °F (538 °C) is 310,000 psi (2.14 GPa), higher than of a hydraulic oil at room temperature. Its lubricity is poor, so positive-displacement pumps are unsuitable and centrifugal pumps have to be used. The addition of caesium shifts the useful temperature range to −95 to 1,300 °F (−71 to 704 °C). The NaK-77 alloy was tested in hydraulic and fluidic systems for the Supersonic Low Altitude Missile.

Environmentally sensitive applications (e.g. farm tractors and marine dredging) may benefit from using biodegradable hydraulic fluids. Natural oils such as rapeseed are used as base stocks for fluids where biodegradability and renewable sources are considered important, e.g. when there is the risk of an oil spill. Typically these oils are available as ISO 32, ISO 46, and ISO 68 specification oils. ASTM standards ASTM-D-6006, Guide for Assessing Biodegradability of Hydraulic Fluids and ASTM-D-6046, Standard Classification of Hydraulic Fluids for Environmental Impact are relevant.

== Safety ==
Because industrial hydraulic systems operate at hundreds to thousands of PSI and temperatures reaching hundreds of degrees Celsius, severe injuries and death can result from component failures and care must always be taken when performing maintenance on hydraulic systems.

Fire resistance is a property available with specialized fluids. Water-glycol and polyol-ester are some of these specialized fluids that contain excellent thermal and hydrolytic properties, which aid in fire resistance.

== Uses ==
=== Brake fluid ===
Brake fluid is a subtype of hydraulic fluid with high boiling point, both when new (specified by the equilibrium boiling point) and after absorption of water vapor (specified by wet boiling point). Under the heat of braking, both free water and water vapor in a braking system can boil into a compressible vapor, resulting in brake failure. Glycol-ether based fluids are hygroscopic, and absorbed moisture will greatly reduce the boiling point over time. Mineral oil and silicone based fluids are not hygroscopic.

=== Power steering fluid ===
Power steering fluid is a sub type of hydraulic fluid. Most are mineral oil or silicone based fluids, while some use automatic transmission fluid, made from synthetic base oil. Automatic transmissions use fluids for their lubrication, cooling and hydraulic properties for viscous couplings.

Use of the wrong type of fluid can lead to failure of the power steering pump.

=== Aircraft hydraulic systems ===
As aircraft performance increased in the mid-20th century, the amount of force required to operate mechanical flight controls became excessive, and hydraulic systems were introduced to reduce pilot effort. The hydraulic actuators are controlled by valves; these in turn are operated directly by input from the aircrew (hydro-mechanical) or by computers obeying control laws (fly by wire).

Hydraulic power is used for other purposes. It can be stored in accumulators to start an auxiliary power unit (APU) for self-starting the aircraft's main engines. Many aircraft equipped with the M61 family of cannon use hydraulic power to drive the gun system, permitting reliable high rates of fire.

The hydraulic power itself comes from pumps driven by the engines directly, or by electrically driven pumps. In modern commercial aircraft these are electrically driven pumps; should all the engines fail in flight the pilot will deploy a propeller-driven electric generator called a Ram-Air Turbine (RAT) which is concealed under the fuselage. This provides electrical power for the hydraulic pumps and control systems as power is no longer available from the engines. In that system and others, electric pumps can provide both redundancy and the means of operating hydraulic systems without the engines operating, which can be very useful during maintenance.

==== Contamination ====
Special, stringent care is required when handling aircraft hydraulic fluid, as it is critical to flight safety that it stay free from contamination. It is also necessary to strictly adhere to authorized references when servicing or repairing any aircraft system. Samples from aircraft hydraulic systems are taken during heavy aircraft maintenance checks (primarily C and D checks) to check contamination.

Military Spec 1246C is one fluid contamination specification.

The ISO fluid contamination scale assigns a contamination category based on particle size count and distribution.

=== Other uses ===
The properties of HLP 32 hydraulic oil make it ideal for lubricating machine tools.

== Specifications ==
=== According to DIN 51502 ===
- HL: With agents to enhance corrosion protection and age resistance. Used in hydraulic systems that do not pose any requirements as to wear protection.
- HLP: With agents to enhance corrosion protection and age resistance. Suitable for most fields of application and components.
- HLPD: As HLP but also used in systems where solid or liquid contamination need to be kept temporarily suspended.
- HVLP: With agents to enhance corrosion protection, age resistance, to reduce scuffing wear in mixed friction areas, and to improve the viscosity-temperature behavior. Used in system operated over a wide temperature range.
- HVLPD: As HVLP but also used in systems where solid or liquid contamination need to be kept temporarily suspended.

=== According to MIL for military applications ===
- Mil-PRF-5606 (originally Mil-H-5606): Mineral base, flammable, fairly low flashpoint, usable from −65 to 275 °F (−54 to 135 °C), red color, developed in the 1940s
- MIL-PRF-6083: Usable from −54 °C to 135 °C "where corrosion protection is required and a determination has been made that MIL-PRF-46170 (FRH) hydraulic fluid cannot be used. This includes use in recoil mechanisms and hydraulic systems for rotating weapons or aiming devices of tactical and support ordnance equipment, except combat armored vehicles/equipment which require FRH. The hydraulic fluid is also used as a preservative fluid for aircraft hydraulic systems and components where MIL-H-5606 (OHA) or MIL-PRF-87257 is used as an operational fluid."

Synthetic hydrocarbon base: These synthetic fluids are compatible with mineral-base hydraulic fluids and were developed to address the low flash point draw back of mineral based hydraulic fluids.

- Mil-H-83282: Synthetic hydrocarbon base, higher flashpoint, self-extinguishing, backward compatible to -5606, red color, rated to −40 °F (−40 °C) degrees.
- Mil-H-87257: A development of -83282 fluid to improve its low temperature viscosity.

=== Multi purpose oil UTTO/STOU ===
- UTTO: Is an abbreviation for "Universal Tractor Transmission Oil". It is a hydraulic oil that can also be used in the transmissions and wet brakes of machines like tractors.
- STOU: Is an abbreviation for "Super Tractor Oil Universal". It is a hydraulic oil that can also be used in the motor, the transmissions and wet brakes. So its main difference to the UTTO oil is that it can be used also as an motor oil.

=== Phosphate-ester base ===
- US/NATO Military specification - MIL-H-8446
- Boeing Seattle - BMS3-11
- Boeing Long Beach - DMS2014
- Boeing Long Island - CDS5478
- Lockheed - LAC C-34-1224
- Airbus Industrie - NSA307110
- British Aerospace - BAC M.333.B
- Bombardier - BAMS 564–003
- SAE - Ac974
- SAE - AS1241
- Skydrol

=== Viscosity ===
Commonly used hydraulic oil viscosities fall under the ISO VG (Viscosity Grade) classification system, which is based on the oil's kinematic viscosity at 40 °C (104 °F). The most prevalent grades for general industrial and mobile hydraulic systems are typically:

- ISO VG 32
- ISO VG 46
- ISO VG 68

Additional viscosities such as the following, are also used, but less frequently or for specific low/high-temperature applications.

- ISO VG 15
- ISO VG 22
- ISO VG 100

== See also ==
- Dexron
- Hydraulic brake
- Hydraulic fuse
- Hydraulics International, INC.
- Hydropneumatic suspension - automobile application
- Oleo strut - aircraft application
- Osmosis
- Skydrol
