= C6H12N4O2 =

The molecular formula C_{6}H_{12}N_{4}O_{2} (molar mass: 172.18 g/mol, exact mass: 172.0960 u) may refer to:

- Enduracididine
- Tetramethylazodicarboxamide
