= C6H8N2 =

The molecular formula C_{6}H_{8}N_{2} may refer to:

- Adiponitrile
- 1,4-Diisocyanobutane
- Dimethylpyrazine, an alkylpyrazine
- 2-Methylglutaronitrile
- 2-Picolylamine
- Phenylenediamines
  - o-phenylenediamine
  - m-phenylenediamine
  - p-phenylenediamine
- Phenylhydrazine
