= Zosurabalpin =

Investigational antibiotic

Clinical data
- Other names: N^{2.2.2.1,3}-anhydro(N^{2}-[(2-([2-(aminomethyl)-4'-carboxy[1,1'-biphenyl]-3-yl]sulfanyl)pyridin-3-yl)methyl]-L-ornithyl-L-lysyl-N-methyl-L-tryptophan

Identifiers
- IUPAC name: 4-[(11S,14S,17S)-14-(4-aminobutyl)-11-(3-aminopropyl)-17-(1H-indol-3-ylmethyl)-16-methyl-12,15,18-trioxo-2-thia-4,10,13,16,19-pentazatricyclo[19.4.0.0^{3,8}]pentacosa-1(25),3(8),4,6,21,23-hexaen-22-yl]benzoic acid
- CAS Number: 2379336-76-0
- PubChem CID: 148636827
- UNII: 5Y6W5N1U0S

Chemical and physical data
- Formula: C_{43}H_{50}N_{8}O_{5}S
- Molar mass: 790.98 g·mol^{−1}
- 3D model (JSmol): Interactive image
- SMILES: CN1[C@H](C(=O)NCC2=C(C=CC=C2SC3=C(CN[C@H](C(=O)N[C@H](C1=O)CCCCN)CCCN)C=CC=N3)C4=CC=C(C=C4)C(=O)O)CC5=CNC6=CC=CC=C65
- InChI: InChI=1S/C43H50N8O5S/c1-51-37(23-30-25-47-34-12-3-2-10-32(30)34)40(53)49-26-33-31(27-16-18-28(19-17-27)43(55)56)11-6-15-38(33)57-41-29(9-8-22-46-41)24-48-35(14-7-21-45)39(52)50-36(42(51)54)13-4-5-20-44/h2-3,6,8-12,15-19,22,25,35-37,47-48H,4-5,7,13-14,20-21,23-24,26,44-45H2,1H3,(H,49,53)(H,50,52)(H,55,56)/t35-,36-,37-/m0/s1; Key:NJFUXFYUHIHHOJ-FSEITFBQSA-N

Zosurabalpin (RG6006, Abx-MCP, Ro7223280) is an experimental antibiotic developed in a collaboration between the pharmaceutical company Roche and scientists from Harvard University, for the treatment of carbapenem-resistant Acinetobacter baumannii (CRAB). It targets a lipopolysaccharide transporter. It works by recognizing a composite binding site made up of both the Lpt transporter and its LPS substrate. The chemical family to which it belongs was first disclosed in 2019, but the particular structure of RG6006 remained confidential until publication of the testing results in 2023.

== See also ==
- Clovibactin
- Novobiocin
- Teixobactin
