= Adipamide =

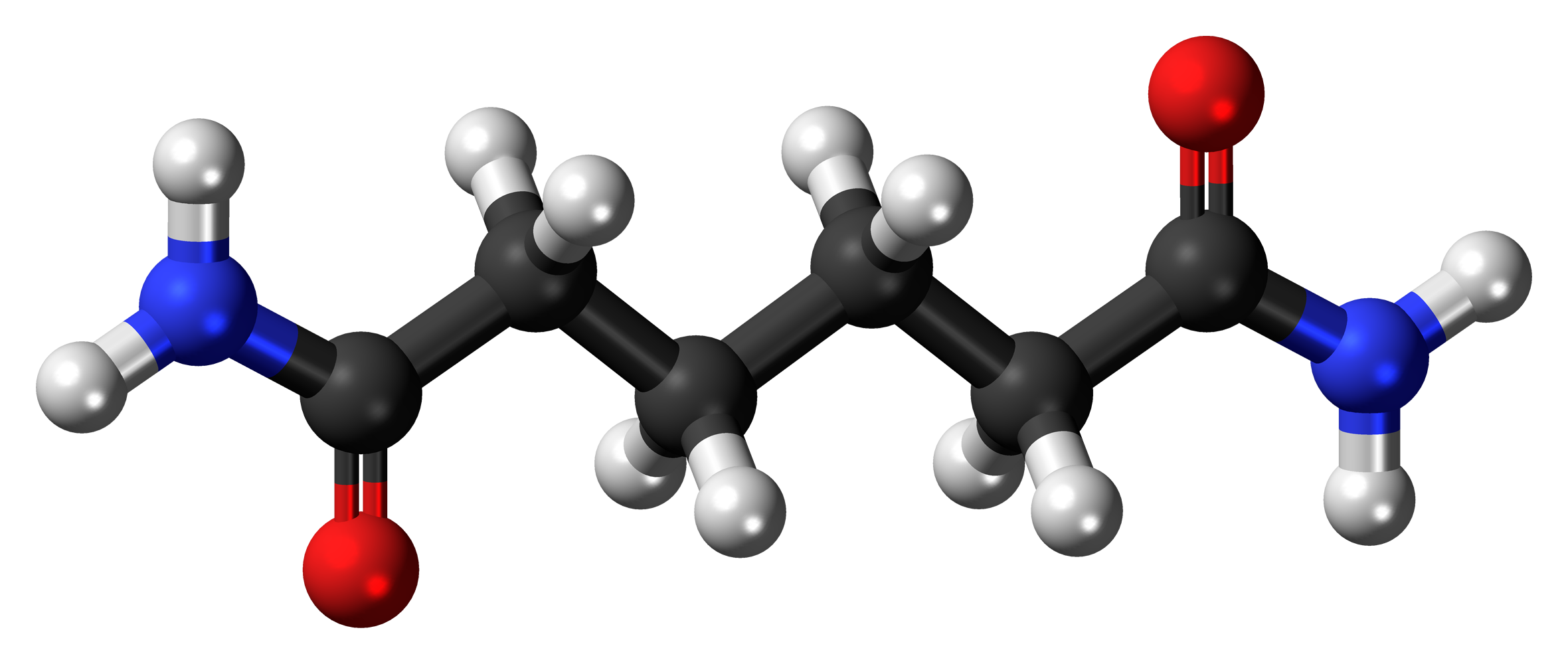

Names
- Preferred IUPAC name Hexanediamide
- Other names Hexanedioic diamide

Identifiers
CAS Number	628-94-4
3D model (JSmol)	Interactive image; Interactive image
Beilstein Reference	4-02-00-01972
ChemSpider	11858
ECHA InfoCard	100.010.057
EC Number	211-062-5
MeSH	Adipamide
PubChem CID	12364
RTECS number	AU7800000
UNII	40DRU033OW
CompTox Dashboard (EPA)	DTXSID4020032
- InChI: InChI=1S/C6H12N2O2/c7-5(9)3-1-2-4-6(8)10/h1-4H2,(H2,7,9)(H2,8,10) Key: GVNWZKBFMFUVNX-UHFFFAOYSA-N; InChI=1S/C6H12N2O2/c7-5(9)3-1-2-4-6(8)10/h1-4H2,(H2,7,9)(H2,8,10) Key: GVNWZKBFMFUVNX-UHFFFAOYSA-N; InChI=1/C6H12N2O2/c7-5(9)3-1-2-4-6(8)10/h1-4H2,(H2,7,9)(H2,8,10) Key: GVNWZKBFMFUVNX-UHFFFAOYAG
- SMILES: NC(=O)CCCCC(N)=O; O=C(N)CCCCC(=O)N

Properties
Chemical formula	C_{6}H_{12}N_{2}O_{2}
Molar mass	144.174 g·mol^{−1}
Appearance	powder
Melting point	220 to 225 °C (428 to 437 °F; 493 to 498 K)
Solubility in water	4.4 g/L (12 °C)

Related compounds
Related compounds	hexanedioic acid hexanedihydrazide hexanedioyl dichloride hexanedinitrile
- Except where otherwise noted, data are given for materials in their standard state (at 25 °C [77 °F], 100 kPa). verify (what is ?) Infobox references

Adipamide is the organic compound with the formula (CH_{2}CH_{2}C(O)NH_{2})_{2}. It is a white solid. The dominant commercial interest in adipamides is related to their presence in nylons.

Adipamide is formed by treating dimethyl adipate with concentrated ammonia.
