= Potassium adipate =

Names
- Preferred IUPAC name Dipotassium hexanedioate

Identifiers
CAS Number	19147-16-1
3D model (JSmol)	Interactive image
ChemSpider	7970260
ECHA InfoCard	100.038.928
EC Number	242-838-1
E number	E357 (antioxidants, ...)
PubChem CID	9794493
UNII	493TD6PDYS
CompTox Dashboard (EPA)	DTXSID60894861
- InChI: InChI=1S/C6H10O4.2K/c7-5(8)3-1-2-4-6(9)10;;/h1-4H2,(H,7,8)(H,9,10);;/q;2*+1/p-2 Key: GCHCGDFZHOEXMP-UHFFFAOYSA-L; InChI=1/C6H10O4.2K/c7-5(8)3-1-2-4-6(9)10;;/h1-4H2,(H,7,8)(H,9,10);;/q;2*+1/p-2 Key: GCHCGDFZHOEXMP-NUQVWONBAE
- SMILES: C(CCC(=O)[O-])CC(=O)[O-].[K+].[K+]

Properties
Chemical formula	K_{2}C_{6}H_{8}O_{4}
Molar mass	222.322 g/mol
- Except where otherwise noted, data are given for materials in their standard state (at 25 °C [77 °F], 100 kPa). verify (what is ?) Infobox references

Potassium adipate is a compound with formula K_{2}C_{6}H_{8}O_{4}. It is a potassium salt and common source ingredient of adipic acid.

It has E number E357.

== See also ==
- Sodium adipate
