= C10H16O4 =

The molecular formula C_{10}H_{16}O_{4} (molar mass: 200.23 g/mol, exact mass: 200.1049 u) may refer to:

- Camphoric acid
- 2-Decendioic acid
