= 2-hydroxycyclohexanone 2-monooxygenase =

Class of enzymes

Identifiers
- EC no.: 1.14.13.66
- CAS no.: 62628-31-3

Databases
- IntEnz: IntEnz view
- BRENDA: BRENDA entry
- ExPASy: NiceZyme view
- KEGG: KEGG entry
- MetaCyc: metabolic pathway
- PRIAM: profile
- PDB structures: RCSB PDB PDBe PDBsum
- Gene Ontology: AmiGO / QuickGO
Search
- PMC: articles
- PubMed: articles
- NCBI: proteins

2-hydroxycyclohexanone 2-monooxygenase (EC 1.14.13.66) is an enzyme that catalyzes the chemical reaction

2-hydroxycyclohexan-1-one
+ NADPH
O_{2} + H^{+}
H_{2}O
6-hydroxyhexano-6-lactone
+ NADP^{+}

The four substrates of this enzyme are 2-hydroxycyclohexan-1-one, reduced nicotinamide adenine dinucleotide phosphate (NADPH), oxygen, and a proton. Its products are 6-hydroxyhexano-6-lactone, oxidised NADP^{+}, and water.

This enzyme is an oxidoreductase, acting on paired donors, with molecular oxygen as oxidant and incorporating one of its atoms. The systematic name of this enzyme class is 2-hydroxycyclohexan-1-one,NADPH:oxygen 2-oxidoreductase (1,2-lactonizing). The product spontaneously forms 6-oxohexanoic acid and in Acinetobacter this can be further oxidised to adipic acid.

6-hydroxyhexano-6-lactone
6-oxohexanoic acid
adipic acid
