= Pseudouridimycin =

Chemical compound

Legal status
- Legal status: Investigational

Identifiers
- IUPAC name: (2S)-2-[[2-(diaminomethylideneamino)acetyl]-hydroxyamino]-N-[[(2R,3S,4R,5S)-5-(2,4-dioxo-1H-pyrimidin-5-yl)-3,4-dihydroxyoxolan-2-yl]methyl]pentanediamide
- CAS Number: 1566586-52-4
- PubChem CID: 72792467
- ChemSpider: 59651398
- ChEBI: CHEBI:199549
- PDB ligand: PUM (PDBe, RCSB PDB)

Chemical and physical data
- Formula: C_{17}H_{26}N_{8}O_{9}
- Molar mass: 486.442 g·mol^{−1}
- 3D model (JSmol): Interactive image
- SMILES: C1=C(C(=O)NC(=O)N1)[C@H]2[C@@H]([C@@H]([C@H](O2)CNC(=O)[C@H](CCC(=O)N)N(C(=O)CN=C(N)N)O)O)O
- InChI: InChI=1S/C17H26N8O9/c18-9(26)2-1-7(25(33)10(27)5-22-16(19)20)15(31)21-4-8-11(28)12(29)13(34-8)6-3-23-17(32)24-14(6)30/h3,7-8,11-13,28-29,33H,1-2,4-5H2,(H2,18,26)(H,21,31)(H4,19,20,22)(H2,23,24,30,32)/t7-,8+,11+,12+,13-/m0/s1; Key:XDEYHXABZOKKDZ-YFKLLHAASA-N

Pseudouridimycin (PUM) is an experimental antibiotic isolated from the soil bacteria Streptomyces albus. It inhibits bacterial RNA polymerase through a different mechanism from previously discovered drugs. Pseudouridimycin shows useful activity against pathogens such as multidrug-resistant Streptococcus pyogenes, and while it is unclear whether it will be suitable for development for medical use in its own right, modified derivatives have been produced with improved stability and similar antibiotic properties.

== See also ==
- Teixobactin
- Salbostatin
