= Dimethyl adipate =

Chemical compound (CH2CH2CO2CH3)2

Names
- Preferred IUPAC name Dimethyl hexanedioate

Identifiers
CAS Number	627-93-0
3D model (JSmol)	Interactive image
ChemSpider	11824
ECHA InfoCard	100.010.019
PubChem CID	12329
UNII	BY71RX0R62
CompTox Dashboard (EPA)	DTXSID8025096
- InChI: InChI=1S/C8H14O4/c1-11-7(9)5-3-4-6-8(10)12-2/h3-6H2,1-2H3 Key: UDSFAEKRVUSQDD-UHFFFAOYSA-N
- SMILES: COC(=O)CCCCC(=O)OC

Properties
Chemical formula	C_{8}H_{14}O_{4}
Molar mass	174.196 g·mol^{−1}
Appearance	Colorless liquid
Density	1.06 g/cm^{3} (20 °C)
Melting point	10.3 °C (50.5 °F; 283.4 K)
Boiling point	227 °C (441 °F; 500 K)
Solubility in water	< 1 g/L
Viscosity	2.5 cP @ 25°C

Hazards
Flash point	107 °C (225 °F; 380 K)
- Except where otherwise noted, data are given for materials in their standard state (at 25 °C [77 °F], 100 kPa). Infobox references

Dimethyl adipate is the organic compound with the formula (CH_{2}CH_{2}CO_{2}CH_{3})_{2}. It is a colorless oily liquid. Although the main commercial interest in adipates is related to the production of nylons, this diester is used as a plasticizer, a solvent for paint stripping and resins, and a pigment dispersant.

== Preparation ==
Dimethyl adipate is prepared by esterification of adipic acid with methanol. Less conventional routes include the hydroesterification of butadiene and the carbonylation of 1,4-dimethoxy-2-butene.

It reacts with concentrated ammonia to give the diamide (CH_{2}CH_{2}C(O)NH_{2})_{2}.

== Toxicity ==
Esters of adipic acid exhibit low acute toxicities in animal models. The LD_{50} of this dimethyl ester is estimated at 1800 mg/kg (rat, i.p.).

== Uses ==
Dimethyl adipic acid is used in cosmetics as an emollients and for skin conditioning. It is also used in agrochemicals and dyes, as well as a precursor for the production of pharmaceutical active ingredients and as a component of dibasic esters.
