= NovoBiotic Pharmaceuticals =

American biotechnology company

NovoBiotic Pharmaceuticals is a privately held, early-stage biotechnology company focused on the discovery and development of new drugs from natural sources.

== Early history and focus ==
The company was founded in 2003 in Cambridge, MA (USA), by Northeastern University professors Kim Lewis and Slava Epstein. Lewis is the director of Northeastern’s Antimicrobial Discovery Center, while Epstein is on the faculty of the Department of Biology. Both Lewis and Epstein are paid consultants to this company. The focus of the company is on the discovery of new antibiotics and oncology drugs.

== Research and drug development ==
The founders had led the development of new techniques to search for useful molecules produced by the untapped vast majority of soil and marine bacteria that cannot be initially cultured in the laboratory. They developed diffusion chambers (isolation chips) to be embedded in natural settings to grow "uncultivable" microorganisms in situ, so that they could then be extracted for study. A patent for these techniques is held by Northeastern University, and licensed to NovoBiotic Pharmaceuticals. Over the years NovoBiotic has amassed a large collection of previously uncultivated microorganisms utilizing the diffusion chamber, and screens them for antibiotic activity. NovoBiotic holds the patent rights to any potentially useful molecules that are extracted, identified and characterized. This approach has resulted the discovery of several new antibiotic compounds, including teixobactin.

== Teixobactin ==
NovoBiotic Pharmaceuticals owns the patent rights to teixobactin, an antibiotic that has been shown to be active against pathogenic Gram-positive bacteria that have developed resistance to available approved antibiotics. The discovery and characterization of the compound was reported in 2015 in a collaboration between NovoBiotic, Northeastern University (Boston MA), University of Bonn (Germany) and Selcia Ltd. (UK). Teixobactin is believed to be more robust against mutation of the target pathogens because of its unusual antibiotic mechanism. Rather than binding to relatively mutable proteins in the bacterial cells, it binds to less mutable fatty molecules that are essential cell wall precursors.

== External References ==
Official home page
