= Adipoyl chloride =

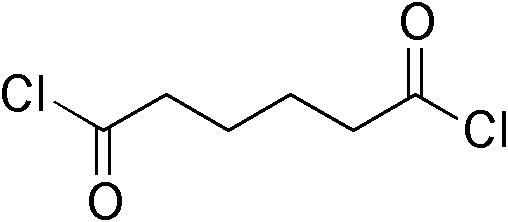
Skeletal formula
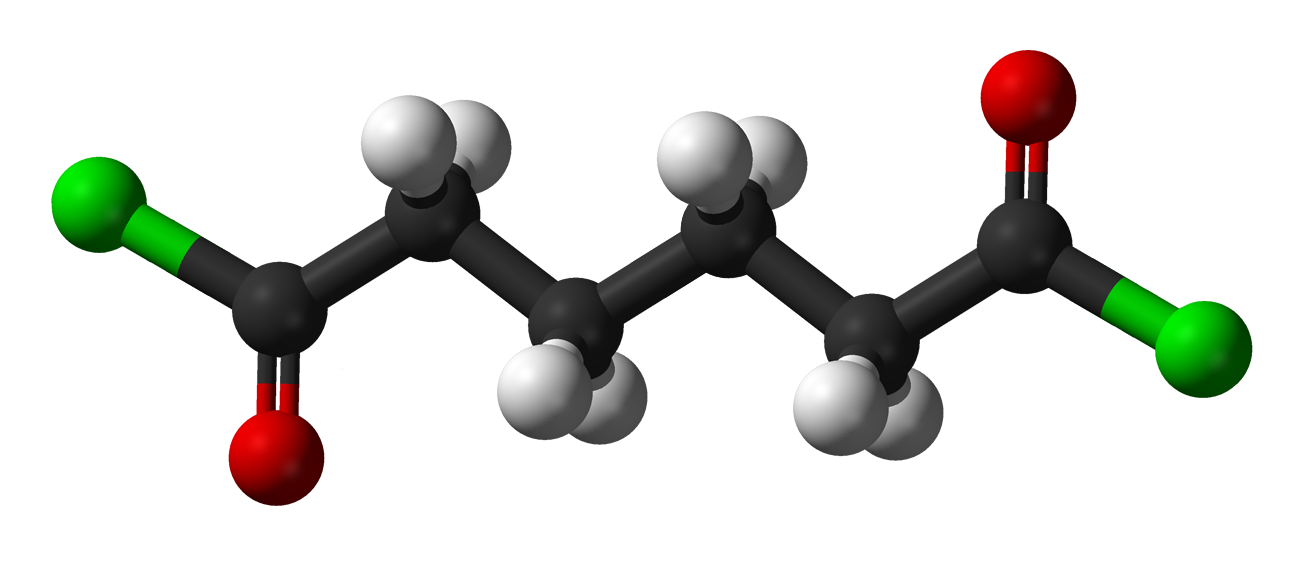

Names
- Preferred IUPAC name Hexanedioyl dichloride
- Other names Adipoyl dichloride

Identifiers
CAS Number	111-50-2
3D model (JSmol)	Interactive image
Beilstein Reference	507709
ChemSpider	54993
ECHA InfoCard	100.003.525
EC Number	203-876-4
PubChem CID	61034
UNII	X7CW7C2XXR
UN number	3265
CompTox Dashboard (EPA)	DTXSID5059402
- InChI: InChI=1S/C6H8Cl2O2/c7-5(9)3-1-2-4-6(8)10/h1-4H2 Key: PWAXUOGZOSVGBO-UHFFFAOYSA-N; InChI=1/C6H8Cl2O2/c7-5(9)3-1-2-4-6(8)10/h1-4H2 Key: PWAXUOGZOSVGBO-UHFFFAOYAI
- SMILES: O=C(Cl)CCCCC(Cl)=O

Properties
Chemical formula	C_{6}H_{8}Cl_{2}O_{2}
Molar mass	183.03 g·mol^{−1}
Density	1.25 g/cm^{3}
Boiling point	105 to 107 °C (221 to 225 °F; 378 to 380 K) at 2 mmHg

Hazards
NFPA 704 (fire diamond)	3 1 2
Flash point	160 °C (320 °F; 433 K) (closed cup)

Related compounds
Related compounds	Adipic acid Hexanedihydrazide; Hexanedinitrile; Hexanediamide
- Except where otherwise noted, data are given for materials in their standard state (at 25 °C [77 °F], 100 kPa). verify (what is ?) Infobox references

Adipoyl chloride (or adipoyl dichloride) is the organic compound with the formula (CH_{2}CH_{2}C(O)Cl)_{2}. It is a colorless liquid. It reacts with water to give adipic acid.

It is prepared by treatment of adipic acid with thionyl chloride. Adipoyl chloride reacts with hexamethylenediamine to form nylon 6,6.

== See also ==
- Adipamide
- Adiponitrile
