= Salbostatin =

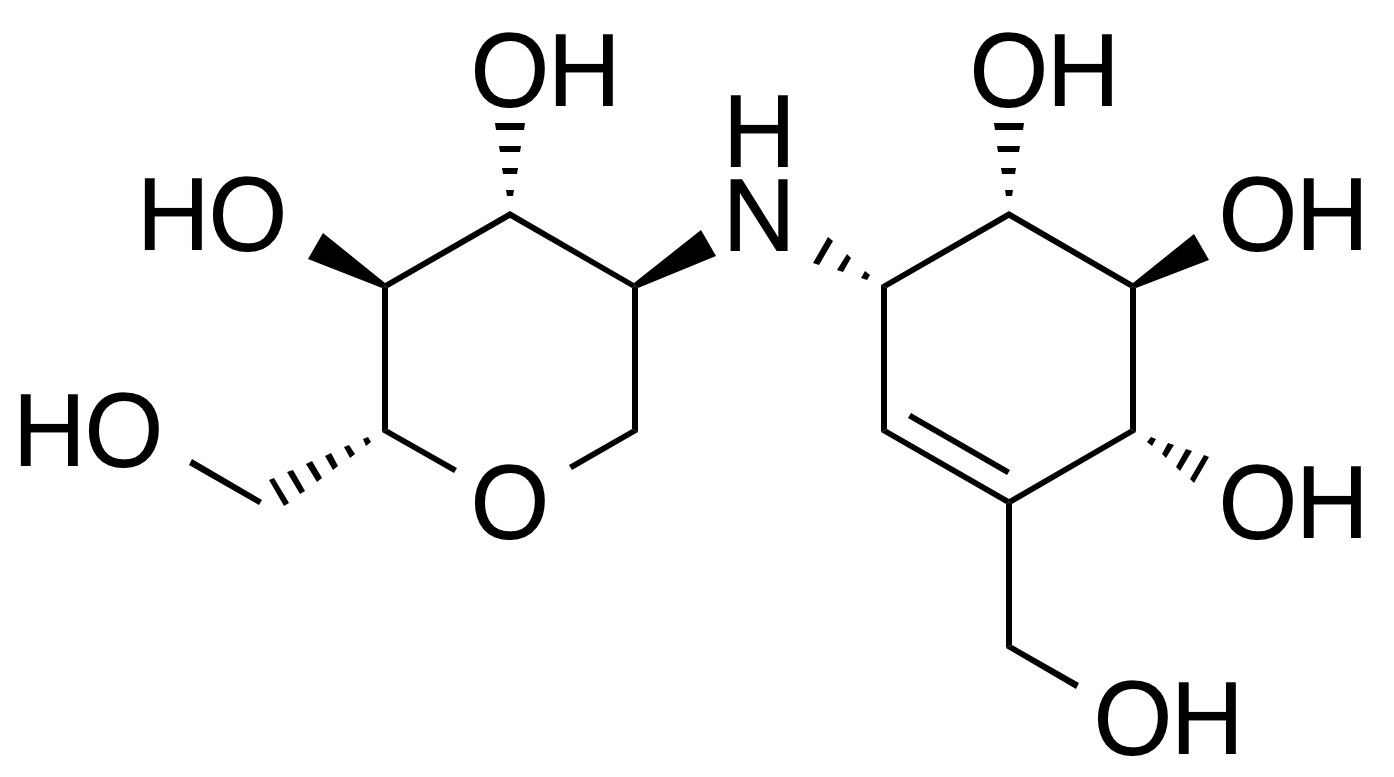

Names
- IUPAC name (1S,2S,3R,6S)-6-[[(3S,4R,5S,6R)-4,5-Dihydroxy-6-(hydroxymethyl)oxan-3-yl]amino]-4-(hydroxymethyl)cyclohex-4-ene-1,2,3-triol

Identifiers
CAS Number	128826-89-1
3D model (JSmol)	Interactive image
ChEBI	CHEBI:190246
ChemSpider	7994299
KEGG	C17698
PubChem CID	9818549
UNII	YQ57B9ZL48
- InChI: InChI=1S/C13H23NO8/c15-2-5-1-6(10(18)13(21)9(5)17)14-7-4-22-8(3-16)12(20)11(7)19/h1,6-21H,2-4H2/t6-,7-,8+,9+,10-,11+,12+,13-/m0/s1 Key: OCTNNXHKAOLDJL-BMGYQPLYSA-N
- SMILES: C1[C@@H]([C@H]([C@@H]([C@H](O1)CO)O)O)N[C@H]2C=C([C@H]([C@@H]([C@H]2O)O)O)CO

Properties
Chemical formula	C_{13}H_{23}O_{8}
Molar mass	307.319 g·mol^{−1}
- Except where otherwise noted, data are given for materials in their standard state (at 25 °C [77 °F], 100 kPa). Infobox references

Salbostatin is an antibiotic and trehalase inhibitor with the molecular formula C_{13}H_{23}O_{8}. Salbostatin is produced by the bacterium Streptomyces albus.

== See also ==
- Pseudouridimycin
