= Bis(2-ethylhexyl) adipate =

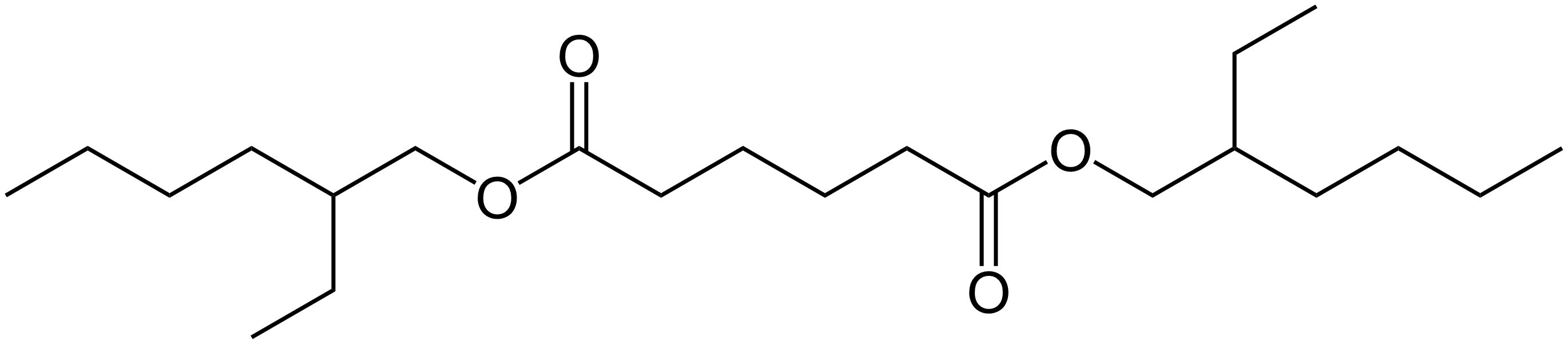

Names
- Preferred IUPAC name Bis(2-ethylhexyl) hexanedioate
- Other names DEHA; Di(2-ethylhexyl) adipate, dioctyl adipate (archaic)

Identifiers
CAS Number	103-23-1
3D model (JSmol)	Interactive image
Abbreviations	DEHA & DOA
ChEBI	CHEBI:34675
ChEMBL	ChEMBL1414950
ChemSpider	7358
ECHA InfoCard	100.002.810
EC Number	203-090-1
KEGG	C14240
PubChem CID	7641
RTECS number	AU9700000
UNII	MBY1SL921L
UN number	3082
CompTox Dashboard (EPA)	DTXSID0020606
- InChI: InChI=1S/C22H42O4/c1-5-9-13-19(7-3)17-25-21(23)15-11-12-16-22(24)26-18-20(8-4)14-10-6-2/h19-20H,5-18H2,1-4H3 Key: SAOKZLXYCUGLFA-UHFFFAOYSA-N; InChI=1/C22H42O4/c1-5-9-13-19(7-3)17-25-21(23)15-11-12-16-22(24)26-18-20(8-4)14-10-6-2/h19-20H,5-18H2,1-4H3 Key: SAOKZLXYCUGLFA-UHFFFAOYAQ
- SMILES: O=C(OCC(CC)CCCC)CCCCC(=O)OCC(CCCC)CC

Properties
Chemical formula	C_{22}H_{42}O_{4}
Molar mass	370.574 g·mol^{−1}
Appearance	colourless oily liquid
Density	0.93 g/cm^{3}
Melting point	−67.8 °C (−90.0 °F; 205.3 K)
Boiling point	417 °C (783 °F; 690 K)
Solubility in water	negligible
Vapor pressure	2.6 mm Hg at 200 °C

Hazards
- Occupational safety and health (OHS/OSH)
Main hazards	Mildly toxic (for humans and animals)
Flash point	196 °C (385 °F; 469 K)
Autoignition temperature	377 °C (711 °F; 650 K)
- Lethal dose or concentration (LD, LC)
LD_{50} (median dose)	900 mg/kg (rat, oral)
Safety data sheet (SDS)	Oxford University
- Except where otherwise noted, data are given for materials in their standard state (at 25 °C [77 °F], 100 kPa). verify (what is ?) Infobox references

Bis(2-ethylhexyl) adipate or DEHA is an organic compound with the formula (CH_{2}CH_{2}CO_{2}C_{8}H_{17})_{2}. It is the diester of 2-ethylhexanol and adipic acid. It is a colorless oily liquid.

DEHA is sometimes called "dioctyl adipate" or DOA, incorrectly. Another name is di(2-ethylhexyl) adipate. The abbreviation DOA has been used for both bis(-2-ethylhexyl)-adipate and dioctyl adipate

== Use ==
As well as related diesters derived from octanol, decanol, isodecanol, etc., it is used as a plasticizer.

DEHA is used as a hydraulic fluid, and a component of aircraft lubricants. It is sometimes also used as an ingredient in PVC-based plastic wrap.

== Toxicity ==
DEHA has very low toxicity. The LD_{50} is estimated at 900 mg/kg (rat, i.v.).

According to the International Agency for Research on Cancer (IARC), it is "not classifiable as to its carcinogenicity to humans (Group 3)."
