= 2-Decenedioic acid =

Names
- Preferred IUPAC name (2E)-Dec-2-enedioic acid

Identifiers
CAS Number	37443-67-7 (E); 6048-93-7 (non-specific)
3D model (JSmol)	Interactive image
ChemSpider	21237627
PubChem CID	6442613
UNII	CS66U78RBR
CompTox Dashboard (EPA)	DTXSID801031664
- InChI: InChI=1S/C10H16O4/c11-9(12)7-5-3-1-2-4-6-8-10(13)14/h5,7H,1-4,6,8H2,(H,11,12)(H,13,14) Key: XUNMWLWTZWWEIE-UHFFFAOYSA-N; InChI=1/C10H16O4/c11-9(12)7-5-3-1-2-4-6-8-10(13)14/h5,7H,1-4,6,8H2,(H,11,12)(H,13,14) Key: XUNMWLWTZWWEIE-UHFFFAOYAA
- SMILES: OC(=O)CCCCCCC=CC(O)=O

Properties
Chemical formula	C_{10}H_{16}O_{4}
Molar mass	200.234 g·mol^{−1}
- Except where otherwise noted, data are given for materials in their standard state (at 25 °C [77 °F], 100 kPa). Infobox references

2-Decenedioic acid is a chemical compound classified as a fatty acid and a dicarboxylic acid.

2-Decenedioic acid is a constituent of honey. It is present in high concentrations in sugar-fed honey, but only in trace amounts in natural honey. Quantitative evaluation of 2-decenedioic acid in honey has therefore been suggested as a method of detecting adulteration of honey.

Decenedioic acid is a natural product found in the fungus Aspergillus unilateralis.
