= Hydrodimerization =

Hydrodimerization is an organic reaction that couples two alkenes to give a symmetrical hydrocarbon. The reaction is often implemented electrochemically; in that case the reaction is called electrodimerization. The reaction can also be induced with samarium diiodide, a one-electron reductant.

Hydrodimerization is the basis of the Monsanto adiponitrile synthesis:

2 CH_{2}=CHCN + 2 e^{−} + 2 H^{+} → NCCH_{2}CH_{2}CH_{2}CH_{2}CN
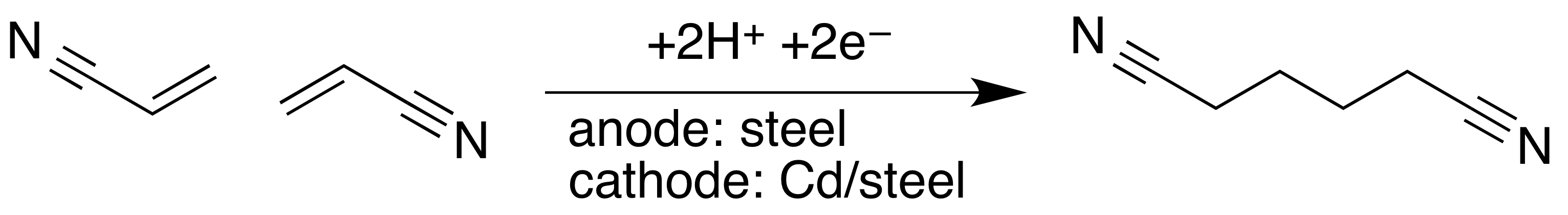

The reaction applies to a number electrophilic alkenes (Michael acceptors).
