= Adipic acid dihydrazide =

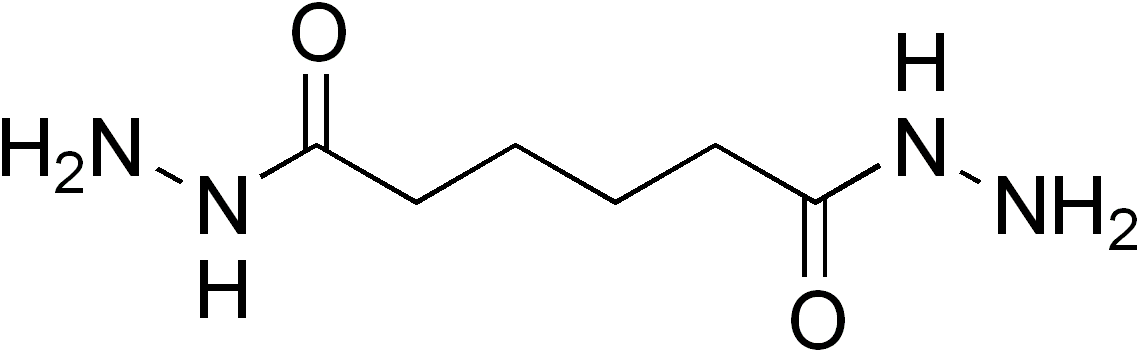

Names
- Preferred IUPAC name Hexanedihydrazide
- Other names Adipic dihydrazide Adipohydrazide Adipyl hydrazide

Identifiers
CAS Number	1071-93-8
3D model (JSmol)	Interactive image
Abbreviations	ADH
Beilstein Reference	973863
ChemSpider	59505
ECHA InfoCard	100.012.727
EC Number	213-999-5
MeSH	Adipic+dihydrazide
PubChem CID	66117
RTECS number	AV1400000
UNII	VK98I9YW5M
CompTox Dashboard (EPA)	DTXSID0044361
- InChI: InChI=1S/C6H14N4O2/c7-9-5(11)3-1-2-4-6(12)10-8/h1-4,7-8H2,(H,9,11)(H,10,12) Key: IBVAQQYNSHJXBV-UHFFFAOYSA-N; InChI=1/C6H14N4O2/c7-9-5(11)3-1-2-4-6(12)10-8/h1-4,7-8H2,(H,9,11)(H,10,12) Key: IBVAQQYNSHJXBV-UHFFFAOYAB
- SMILES: O=C(NN)CCCCC(=O)NN

Properties
Chemical formula	C_{6}H_{14}N_{4}O_{2}
Molar mass	174.20 g/mol
Melting point	176 to 185 °C (349 to 365 °F; 449 to 458 K)

Hazards
Safety data sheet (SDS)	Material Safety Data Sheet

Related compounds
Related compounds	hexanedioic acid hexanedihydrazide hexanedioyl dichloride hexanedinitrile hexanediamide
- Except where otherwise noted, data are given for materials in their standard state (at 25 °C [77 °F], 100 kPa). verify (what is ?) Infobox references

Adipic acid dihydrazide (ADH) is a chemical used for cross-linking water-based emulsions. It can also be used as a hardener for certain epoxy resins. ADH is a symmetrical molecule with a C4 backbone, and the reactive group is C=ONHNH_{2}. Dihydrazides are made by the reaction of an organic acid with hydrazine. Other dihydrazides with different backbones are also common, including isophthalic dihydrazide (IDH) and sebacic dihydrazide (SDH).
