= Clovibactin =

Investigational antibiotic

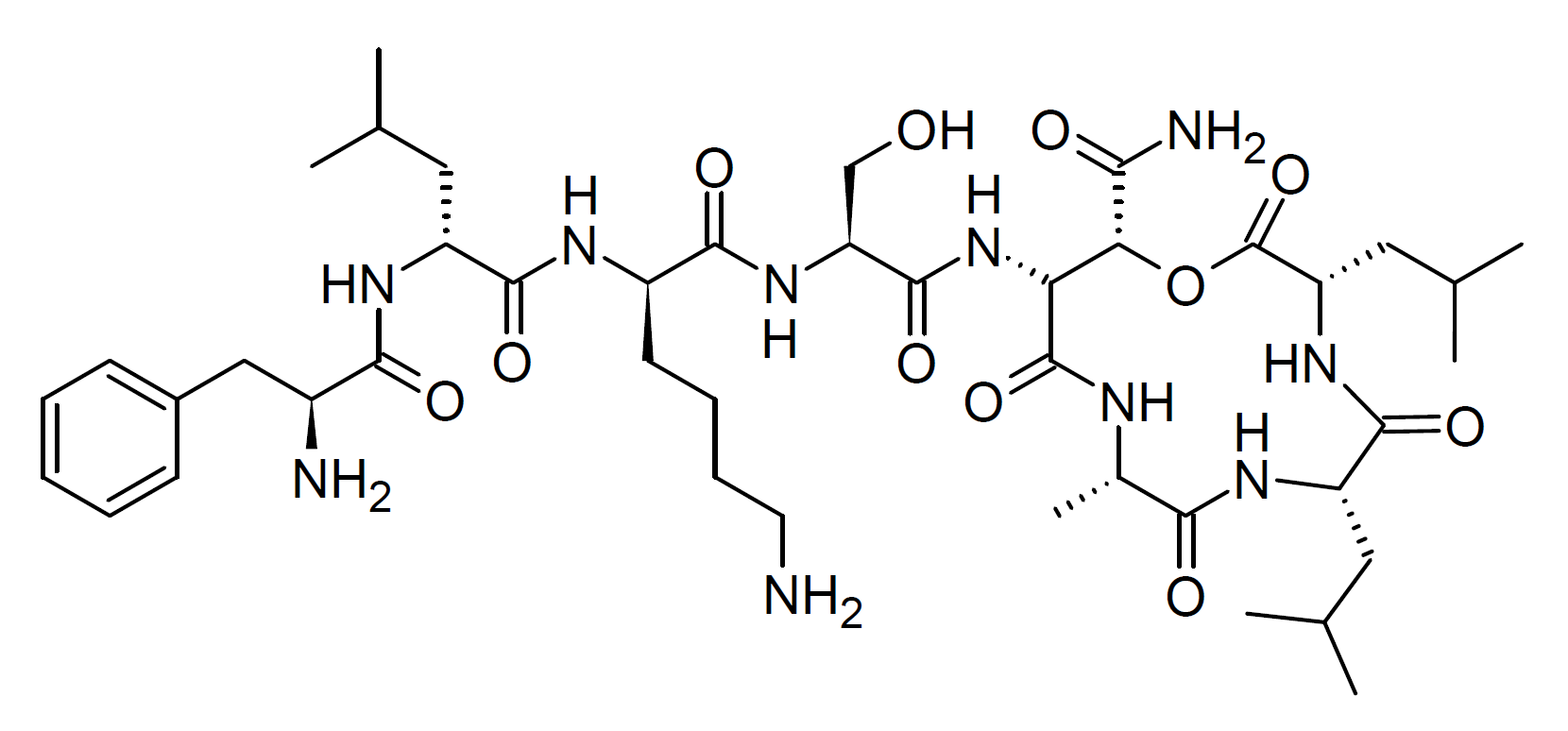

Identifiers
- IUPAC name: (3S,6S,9S,13R)-12-[[(2S)-2-[[(2R)-6-amino-2-[[(2R)-2-[[(2S)-2-amino-3-phenylpropanoyl]amino]-4-methylpentanoyl]amino]hexanoyl]amino]-3-hydroxypropanoyl]amino]-9-methyl-3,6-bis(2-methylpropyl)-2,5,8,11-tetraoxo-1-oxa-4,7,10-triazacyclotridecane-13-carboxamide
- CAS Number: 2247194-77-8
- PubChem CID: 142449498
- ChemSpider: 129309355

Chemical and physical data
- Formula: C_{43}H_{70}N_{10}O_{11}
- Molar mass: 903.092 g·mol^{−1}
- 3D model (JSmol): Interactive image
- SMILES: CC(C)C[C@@H](NC(=O)[C@@H](N)Cc1ccccc1)C(=O)N[C@H](CCCCN)C(=O)N[C@@H](CO)C(=O)NC1C(=O)N[C@@H](C)C(=O)N[C@@H](CC(C)C)C(=O)N[C@@H](CC(C)C)C(=O)O[C@H]1C(N)=O
- InChI: InChI=1S/C43H70N10O11/c1-22(2)17-29-40(60)51-31(19-24(5)6)43(63)64-34(35(46)55)33(42(62)47-25(7)36(56)49-29)53-41(61)32(21-54)52-38(58)28(15-11-12-16-44)48-39(59)30(18-23(3)4)50-37(57)27(45)20-26-13-9-8-10-14-26/h8-10,13-14,22-25,27-34,54H,11-12,15-21,44-45H2,1-7H3,(H2,46,55)(H,47,62)(H,48,59)(H,49,56)(H,50,57)(H,51,60)(H,52,58)(H,53,61)/t25-,27-,28+,29-,30+,31-,32-,33?,34+/m0/s1; Key:SMQAHGKBWXPEHB-MJGFNNBQSA-N

Clovibactin (Novo29) is an experimental antibiotic isolated from an uncultured soil Gram-negative β-proteobacterium Eleftheria terrae ssp. carolina, which is one of many soil bacteria.

== See also ==
- Teixobactin
- Zosurabalpin
