= Diamide =

Diamide may refer to:

- Diamide, any chemical compound containing two amide groups
  - Diamide of a dicarboxylic acid, derivative compound where amide replaces carboxyl
- Diamide, a synonym for tetramethylazodicarboxamide
- Diamide insecticides, a class of insecticides targeting ryanodine receptors
