= Kim Lewis (academic) =

American researcher

- Occupations: Researcher, author and academic

Academic background
- Education: B.S., Biology (1976); Ph.D., Biochemistry (1980)
- Alma mater: Moscow University

Kim Lewis is an American researcher, author and academic. He is a University Distinguished Professor and the director of Antimicrobial Discovery Center at Northeastern University.

His research is focused on antimicrobial tolerance which limits the ability of antibiotics to eradicate an infection; and on antimicrobial drug discovery.

He is a fellow of the American Association for the Advancement of Science, and of the American Academy of Microbiology.

Apart from his work in academia, Dr. Lewis is a co-founder of NovoBiotic Pharmaceuticals, Arietis Pharma, Holobiome, Flightpath Biosciences and Odyssey Therapeutics.

== Education ==
Lewis received both his B.S. in biology (1976) and his Ph.D. in biochemistry (1980) at Moscow University.

== Career ==
In 1976, Lewis joined Moscow University as a researcher. He continued working there until 1984, when he applied to emigrate to the US. He moved to the United States in 1987, where he joined University of Wisconsin as a research associate. In 1988, he joined Massachusetts Institute of Technology as an assistant professor in the Applied Biology Department. After the disbandment of that department, he joined University of Maryland, Baltimore in 1994. Lewis joined Tufts University as an associate professor in 1997 and taught there until 2001, when he joined Northeastern University. In 2004, he became a distinguished research fellow, and in 2011, a distinguished professor at Northeastern University.

== Research and work ==
Antimicrobial tolerance:

Lewis' group discovered that biofilm recalcitrance to treatment is due to the presence of dormant persister cells tolerant of killing by antibiotics. Persisters are cells with low level of ATP, which drops as a result of stochastic variation in expression of energy producing components. His team also discovered an approach to eradicate persisters. Acyldepsipeptide (ADEP) kills persisters in S. aureus and other bacteria by activating the Clp protease, forcing the cell to self-digest.

Uncultured bacteria:

In early 2000s, Lewis began working in collaboration with Slava Epstein to solve the problem of uncultured bacteria that do not grow in vitro. They reasoned uncultured bacteria will grow in their natural environment and developed a diffusion chamber where they are incubated in their natural environment. In a paper published in Science in 2002, they reported growth of uncultured bacteria in a diffusion chamber. Lewis's team subsequently discovered that uncultured bacteria require growth factors produced by their neighbors. These include siderophores for environmental bacteria and quinones for symbionts of the human microbiome

Antimicrobial drug discovery:

In collaboration with NovoBiotic, Lewis discovered teixobactin, a novel cell wall acting antibiotic that is produced by an uncultured bacterium Eleftheria terrae. This is the first antibiotic that acts without detectable resistance. A paper describing the discovery of teixobactin was the most discussed publication of that year, according to Altmetric. Clovibactin is another example of an antibiotic to which resistance does not develop

Lewis and his group also discovered several compounds acting against Gram negative pathogens. These include hygromycin A, rediscovered as a specific inhibitor of Borrelia burgdorferi, the causative agent of Lyme disease and a novel class of antibiotics, the darobactins, inhibitors of BamA, an essential protein of the outer membrane.

== Awards and honors ==
- 1992 - MIT C.E. Reed Faculty Initiative Award
- 2006 - Member, Faculty of 1000 in the Pharmacology & Drug Discovery section
- 2009 - NIH Director's Transformative Award
- 2011 - Fellow, American Academy of Microbiology
- 2013 - Lester O. Krampitz Lecture, Case Western Reserve University
- 2015 - Honorary Lecture, NYU School of Medicine
- 2015 - Lecture, Biomedical Research Council of the US Congress
- 2017 - NIH Director's Walls Lecture
- 2018 - Fellow, American Association for the Advancement of Science
- 2018 - Highly Cited Researcher, Clarivate Analytics
- 2020 - Stuart Levy Lecture, Harvard University
- 2021 - Expertscape World Expert in Microbial Drug Resistance
- 2021 - Danny Thomas Lecture, St. Jude Children's Hospital
- 2022 - Butler Lecture, Princeton University
- 2023 - American Society for Microbiology Award for Applied and Biotechnology Research
- 2024 - Gottlieb Lecture, University of Illinois at Urbana-Champaign

== Books ==
- Bacterial Resistance to Antimicrobials: Mechanisms, Genetics, Medical Practice and Public Health (2001)
- Persister Cells and Infectious Disease (2019)
