= Adipic acid =

Chemical compound (CH2)4(COOH)2

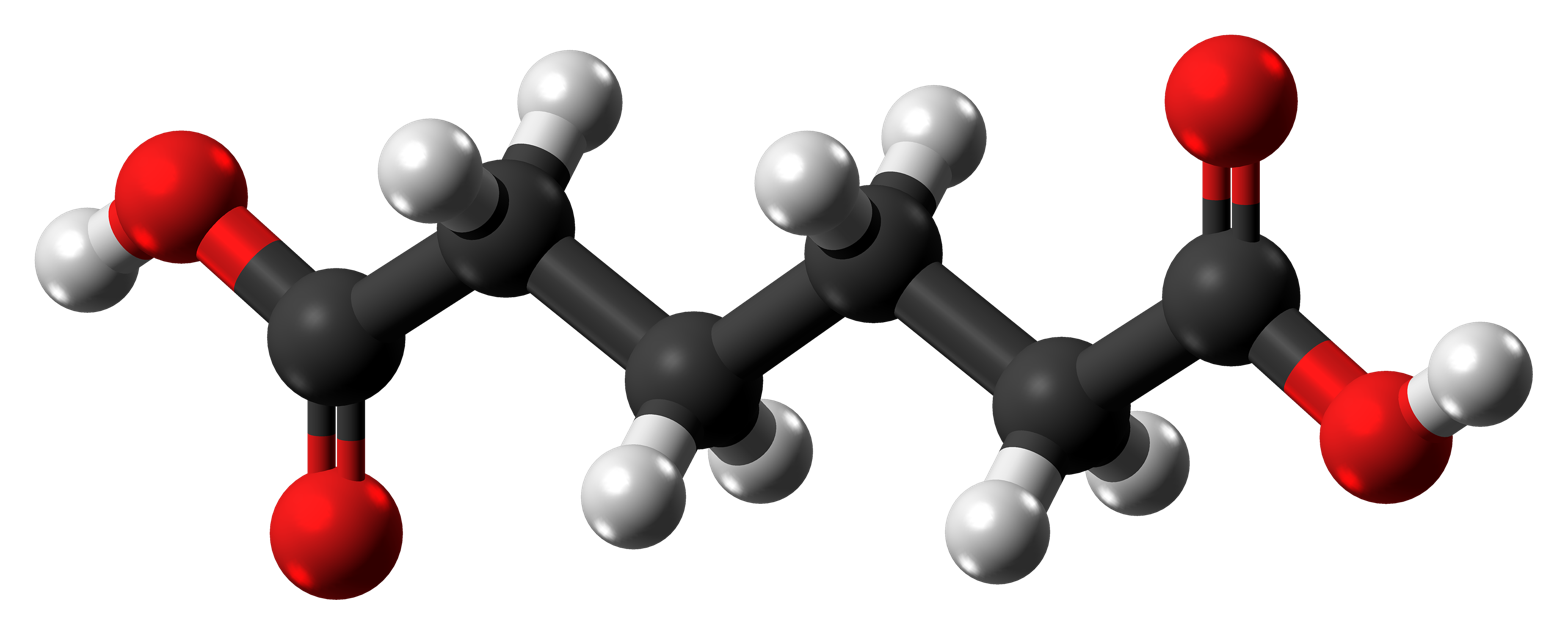

Names
- Preferred IUPAC name Hexanedioic acid
- Other names Adipic acid Butane-1,4-dicarboxylic acid Hexane-1,6-dioic acid 1,4-butanedicarboxylic acid

Identifiers
CAS Number	124-04-9
3D model (JSmol)	Interactive image; Interactive image
Beilstein Reference	1209788
ChEBI	CHEBI:30832
ChEMBL	ChEMBL1157
ChemSpider	191
ECHA InfoCard	100.004.250
EC Number	204-673-3
E number	E355 (antioxidants, ...)
Gmelin Reference	3166
KEGG	D08839
PubChem CID	196
RTECS number	AU8400000
UNII	76A0JE0FKJ
UN number	3077
CompTox Dashboard (EPA)	DTXSID7021605
- InChI: InChI=1S/C6H10O4/c7-5(8)3-1-2-4-6(9)10/h1-4H2,(H,7,8)(H,9,10) Key: WNLRTRBMVRJNCN-UHFFFAOYSA-N; InChI=1/C6H10O4/c7-5(8)3-1-2-4-6(9)10/h1-4H2,(H,7,8)(H,9,10) Key: WNLRTRBMVRJNCN-UHFFFAOYAY
- SMILES: O=C(O)CCCCC(=O)O; C(CCC(=O)O)CC(=O)O

Properties
Chemical formula	C_{6}H_{10}O_{4}
Molar mass	146.142 g·mol^{−1}
Appearance	White crystals Monoclinic prisms
Odor	Odorless
Density	1.360 g/cm^{3}
Melting point	152.1 °C (305.8 °F; 425.2 K)
Boiling point	337.5 °C (639.5 °F; 610.6 K)
Solubility in water	14 g/L (10 °C); 24 g/L (25 °C); 1600 g/L (100 °C)
Solubility	Very soluble in methanol, ethanol soluble in acetone, acetic acid slightly soluble in cyclohexane negligible in benzene, petroleum ether
log P	0.08
Vapor pressure	0.097 hPa (18.5 °C) = 0.073 mmHg
Acidity (pK_{a})	4.43, 5.41
Conjugate base	Adipate
Viscosity	4.54 cP (160 °C)

Structure
Crystal structure	Monoclinic

Thermochemistry
Std enthalpy of formation (Δ_{f}H^{⦵}_{298})	−994.3 kJ/mol

Hazards
- GHS labelling
Pictograms	(GHS07: Exclamation mark)
Signal word	Warning
Hazard statements	H319
Precautionary statements	P264, P280, P305+P351+P338, P337+P313
NFPA 704 (fire diamond)	2 1 0
Flash point	196 °C (385 °F; 469 K)
Autoignition temperature	422 °C (792 °F; 695 K)
- Lethal dose or concentration (LD, LC)
LD_{50} (median dose)	3600 mg/kg (rat)
Safety data sheet (SDS)	External MSDS

Related compounds
Related dicarboxylic acids	glutaric acid pimelic acid
Related compounds	hexanoic acid adipic acid dihydrazide hexanedioyl dichloride hexanedinitrile hexanediamide
- Except where otherwise noted, data are given for materials in their standard state (at 25 °C [77 °F], 100 kPa). Infobox references

Adipic acid or hexanedioic acid is an organic compound with the chemical formula C_{6}H_{10}O_{4}. It is a white crystalline powder at standard temperature and pressure. From an industrial perspective, it is the most important dicarboxylic acid at about 2.5 million tons produced annually, mainly as a precursor for the production of nylon. Adipic acid otherwise rarely occurs in nature, but it is known as manufactured E number food additive E355. Salts and esters of adipic acid are known as adipates.

== Preparation and reactivity ==
Adipic acid is produced by oxidation of a mixture of cyclohexanone and cyclohexanol, which is called KA oil, an abbreviation of ketone-alcohol oil. Nitric acid is the oxidant. The pathway is multistep. Early in the reaction, the cyclohexanol is converted to the ketone, releasing nitrous acid:

HOCH(CH_{2})_{5} + HNO_{3} → O=C(CH_{2})_{5} + HNO_{2} + H_{2}O

The cyclohexanone is then nitrosated, setting the stage for the scission of the C-C bond:

HNO_{2} + HNO_{3} → [NO^{+}][NO_{3}]^{−} + H_{2}O
O=C(CH_{2})_{5} + NO^{+} → O=C(CHNO)(CH_{2})_{4} + H^{+}

Side products of the method include glutaric and succinic acids. Nitrous oxide is produced in about one to one mole ratio to the adipic acid, as well, via the intermediacy of a nitrolic acid.

Related processes start from cyclohexanol, which is obtained from the hydrogenation of phenol.

=== Alternative methods of production ===
Several methods have been developed by carbonylation of butadiene. For example, the hydrocarboxylation proceeds as follows:

CH_{2}=CH−CH=CH_{2} + 2 CO + 2 H_{2}O → HO_{2}C(CH_{2})_{4}CO_{2}H

Another method is oxidative cleavage of cyclohexene using hydrogen peroxide. The waste product is water.

Auguste Laurent discovered adipic acid in 1837 by oxidation of various fats with nitric acid via sebacic acid and gave it the current name because of that (ultimately from Latin adeps, adipis – 'animal fat'; cf. adipose tissue).

=== Reactions ===
Adipic acid is a diprotic acid (it has two acidic groups). The pK_{a} values for their successive deprotonations are 4.41 and 5.41.

With the carboxylate groups separated by four methylene groups, adipic acid is suited for intramolecular condensation reactions. Upon treatment with barium hydroxide at elevated temperatures, it undergoes ketonization to give cyclopentanone.

== Uses ==
About 60% of the 2.5 billion kg of adipic acid produced annually is used as monomer for the production of nylon by a polycondensation reaction with hexamethylene diamine forming nylon 66. Other major applications also involve polymers; it is a monomer for production of polyurethane and its esters are plasticizers, especially in PVC.

=== In medicine ===
Adipic acid has been incorporated into controlled-release formulation matrix tablets to obtain pH-independent release for both weakly basic and weakly acidic drugs. It has also been incorporated into the polymeric coating of hydrophilic monolithic systems to modulate the intragel pH, resulting in zero-order release of a hydrophilic drug. The disintegration at intestinal pH of the enteric polymer shellac has been reported to improve when adipic acid was used as a pore-forming agent without affecting release in the acidic media. Other controlled-release formulations have included adipic acid with the intention of obtaining a late-burst release profile.

=== In foods ===
Small but significant amounts of adipic acid are used as a food ingredient as a flavorant and gelling aid. It is used in some calcium carbonate antacids to make them tart. As an acidulant in baking powders, it avoids the undesirable hygroscopic properties of tartaric acid. Adipic acid, rare in nature, does occur naturally in beets, but this is not an economical source for commerce compared to industrial synthesis.

== Safety ==
Adipic acid, like most carboxylic acids, is a mild skin irritant. It is mildly toxic, with a median lethal dose of 3600 mg/kg for oral ingestion by rats.

== Environmental ==
The production of adipic acid is linked to emissions of N_{2}O, a potent greenhouse gas and cause of stratospheric ozone depletion. At adipic acid producers DuPont and Rhodia (now Invista and Solvay, respectively), processes have been implemented to catalytically convert the nitrous oxide to innocuous products:

2 N_{2}O → 2 N_{2} + O_{2}

== Adipate salts and esters ==
Structural formula of the adipate dianion

The anionic (HO_{2}C(CH_{2})_{4}CO_{2}^{−}) and dianionic (^{−}O_{2}C(CH_{2})_{4}CO_{2}^{−}) forms of adipic acid are referred to as adipates. An adipate compound is a carboxylate salt or ester of the acid.

Some adipate salts are used as acidity regulators, including:

- Sodium adipate (E number E356)
- Potassium adipate (E357)

Some adipate esters are used as plasticizers, including:

- Bis(2-ethylhexyl) adipate
- Dioctyl adipate
- Dimethyl adipate

== Appendix ==
- U.S. FDA citations – GRAS (21 CFR 184.1009), Indirect additive (21 CFR 175.300, 21 CFR 175.320, 21 CFR 176.170, 21 CFR 176.180, 21 CFR 177.1200, 21 CFR 177.1390, 21 CFR 177.1500, 21 CFR 177.1630, 21 CFR 177.1680, 21 CFR 177.2420, 21 CFR 177.2600)
- European Union Citations – Decision 1999/217/EC – Flavoing Substance; Directive 95/2/EC, Annex IV – Permitted Food Additive; 2002/72/EC, Annex A – Authorized monomer for Food Contact Plastics
