= Skydrol =

Hydraulic fluid used in aviation

Skydrol is a brand name of fire-resistant hydraulic fluid used in aviation and aerospace applications. It is a phosphate ester-based fluid that is known for its excellent fire resistance and ability to withstand extreme temperature and pressure conditions. It is manufactured by Solutia (now part of Eastman Chemical Company), and formerly manufactured by Monsanto. There are various lines of Skydrol including Skydrol 500B-4, Skydrol LD-4, and Skydrol 5.

Skydrol is made of a fire-resistant phosphate ester base stock, with a number of oil additives dissolved into it to inhibit corrosion and prevent erosion damage to servo valves. It also includes a purple or green dye to ease identification. It has been approved by most airframe manufacturers including Airbus, Boeing and BAE Systems and has been used in their products for over 50 years.

== Characteristics ==
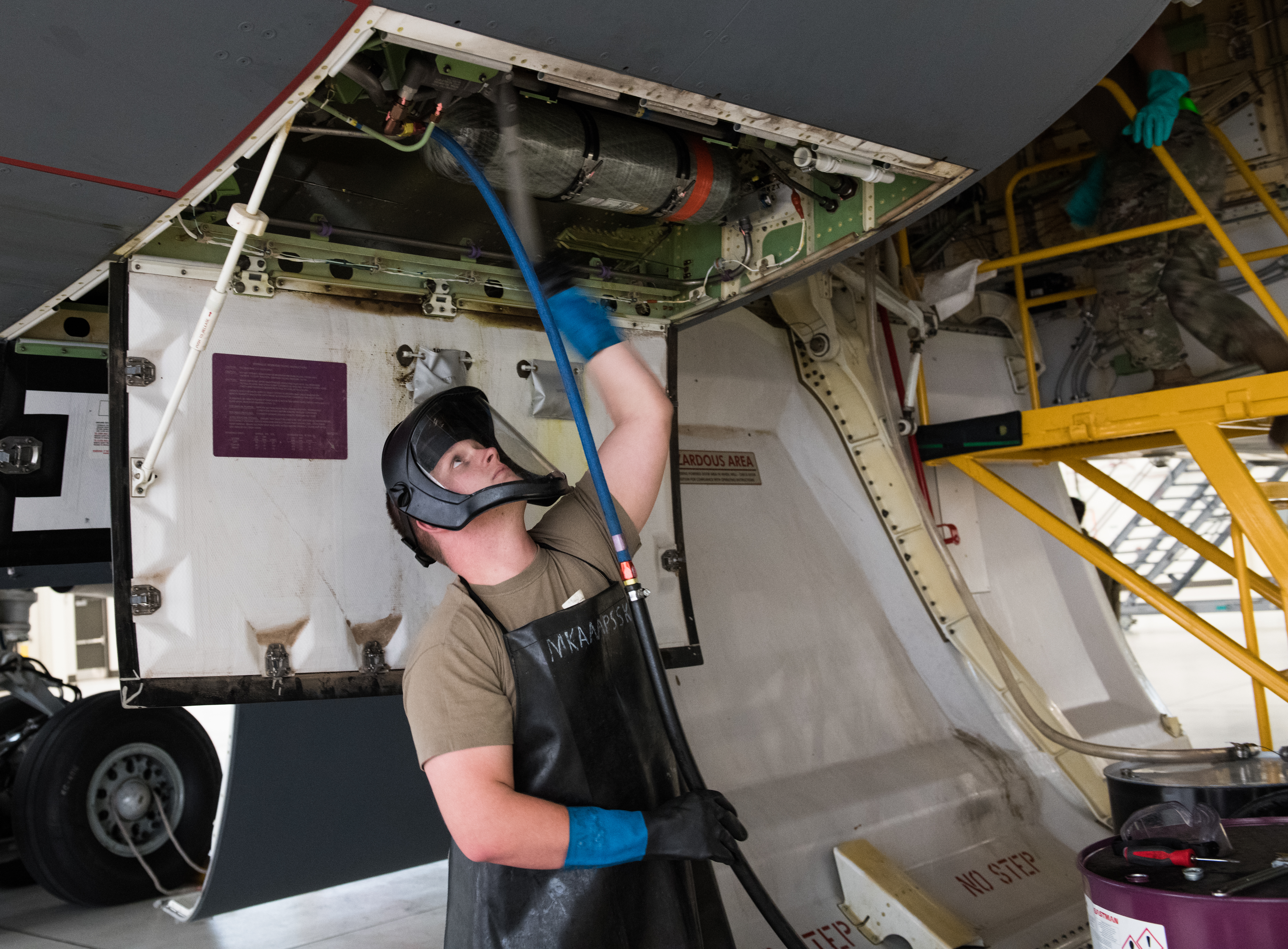
A United States Air Force maintenance technician wearing personal protective equipment pumps Skydrol into a KC-46 Pegasus

Acid number (the proportional content of acid, not pH) and particulate contamination must be monitored while using Skydrol, and generally hydraulic systems should be sampled every C check. Generally recommended contamination levels should be better than AS4059 Class 7 as new, and should not be allowed to degrade beyond Class 9. Skydrol has a 5-year shelf life from the date of manufacture.

Skydrol fluids are extremely irritating to human tissue. Gloves and goggles are recommended safety equipment when servicing Skydrol systems. If the fluid gets on the skin it creates an itchy, red rash with a persistent burning sensation. The effects subside within a few hours; egg white can be applied to the affected area to neutralize the burning. Animal studies have shown that repeated exposure to tributylphosphate, one of the phosphate esters used in Skydrol fluids, may cause urinary bladder damage. If Skydrol gets in the eyes, it creates an intense stinging sensation. The recommended treatment for this is to use an eye-wash station, sometimes mineral oil, castor oil or milk is used.

Skydrol fluids are incompatible with many plastics, paints and adhesives, which can be softened and eventually destroyed by exposure to Skydrol. Some materials (for example rayon, acetate) and rubber-soled shoes may also be damaged by Skydrol.

== Production ==
The Skydrol series of phosphate ester hydraulic fluids were originally jointly developed by the Douglas Aircraft Company and Monsanto in the late 1940s to reduce the fire risk from leaking high pressure mineral oil-based hydraulic fluids impinging on potential ignition sources.

In 1949 Douglas first licensed Monsanto to produce a range of Skydrol materials under their patents. In the 1990s Monsanto became primarily a biotechnology company, and an independent chemical producer, Solutia, was created in 1997 to handle its chemical interests, including Skydrol.

Solutia Inc. built a new facility to produce Skydrol and SkyKleen aviation cleaning solutions in Anniston, Alabama in 2005. In 2012, Solutia was acquired by Eastman Chemical.

== Uses ==
The first type of Skydrol used in aviation was Skydrol 7000 (now obsolete), which was dyed green in colour, as a fire-resistant lubricant in Douglas-designed cabin pressure superchargers (as piston-engined airliners do not have 'bleed air' pressurisation) used in the DC-6 and -7 series piston-engined aircraft, and first flight tested by United Airlines in 1949, who also used Skydrol 7000 in the hydraulic systems of these aircraft, as did quite a number of other airlines including Pan-Am, and KLM and BOAC in Europe.

With the introduction of jet aircraft operating at higher altitudes, and lower external temperatures there was a need for improved phosphate ester fluids. The story of the introduction of Skydrol type fluids in civil aviation is covered in a Kindle book entitled "The Skydrol Story", in which it describes how the Vickers Vanguard was the first non US built aircraft to introduce Skydrol as a hydraulic fluid when Trans-Canada Air Lines adopted it for their Vanguard fleet.

In the years following, during the flight testing of the Boeing 707 a test aircraft suffered a gear collapse which led to a fire fueled by leaking hydraulic fluid. As a result of this incident, Boeing implemented the use of Skydrol on the 707 and then later on the 720 and subsequent aircraft. Skydrol 500B (dyed purple in colour) then proliferated through the aerospace industry due to its flame retardant capability, but predominantly only in the civilian world on transport category aircraft.

Skydrol was never adopted into widespread military use, ostensibly because if an aircraft was hit by enemy fire on a mission it was believed that it is merely academic whether the fluid is flame retardant or not, as the aircraft would have been expected to be destroyed.

The predominant competing mineral oil fluid, MIL-PRF-5606 had higher flammability due to its lower flash point, however modern derivatives such as MIL-PRF-87257 have a flash point much closer to that of Skydrol.

Some smaller business jets still use MIL-H-5606, such as the Dassault Falcon series jets, most of the Cessna Citations and all models of Learjet. Business jets using Skydrol include the Cessna Citation X, Gulfstreams and Bombardier Challenger & Global Express Series.

Special seals were developed for use with Skydrol, as the elastomers available at the time were incompatible - the first seals used were made from butyl rubber, which were resistant to the phosphate ester fluid but suffered some early leakages. Modern Skydrol compatible seals are usually made from EPDM (ethylene propylene diene monomer) or PTFE (polytetrafluroethylene).

== Similar fluids ==
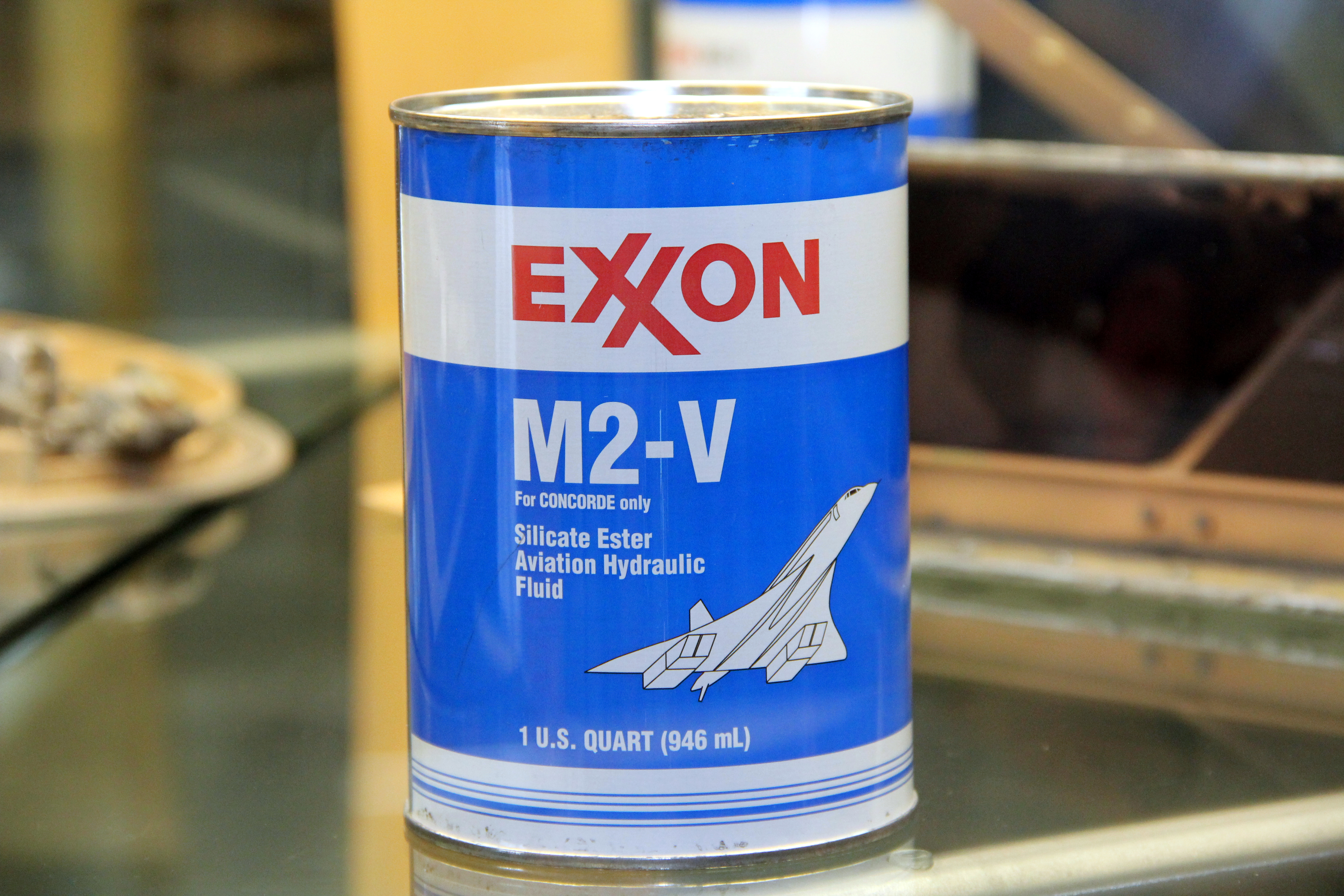
A can of Exxon M2-V hydraulic fluid for the Concorde, on display at the Technik Museum Sinsheim

The Concorde supersonic airliner was unable to use standard Skydrol in its hydraulic systems, due to the high temperatures that the aircraft sustained during supersonic flight. Instead, the M2-V silicate ester hydraulic fluid was developed for the Concorde.
