= Isolation chip =

Method of culturing bacteria

The Isolation chip (or ichip) is a method of culturing bacteria. Using regular methods, 99% of bacterial species found in nature are not able to be cultured as they do not grow in conditions made in a laboratory, a problem called the great plate count anomaly. The ichip instead cultures bacterial species within its soil environment using tiny diffusion chambers. The soil is diluted in molten agar and nutrients such that only a single cell, on average, grows in the ichip's small compartments or wells, hence the term "isolation". The chip is then enclosed in a semipermeable plastic membrane and buried back in the dirt to allow in nutrients not available in the lab. With this culturing method, about 50 to 60 percent of bacterial species are able to survive.

This is of particular relevance to drug discovery. Notably, the bacterial species Eleftheria terrae, which makes the antibiotic teixobactin that has shown promise against many drug-resistant strains like methicillin-resistant Staphylococcus aureus, was discovered using the ichip in 2015. In addition to antibiotics, it is argued that anti-cancer agents, anti-inflammatory and immunosuppressives (which have previously been discovered from bacteria) as well as potential energy sources could be discovered.

The ichip was developed by the drug discovery company NovoBiotic Pharmaceuticals, founded by Kim Lewis and Slava Epstein.
