= Eleftheria terrae =

Scientific classification
- Domain: Bacteria
- Phylum: Pseudomonadota
- Class: Betaproteobacteria
- Genus: Eleftheria Ling et al., 2015
- Species: E. terrae

Binomial name
- Eleftheria terrae Ling et al., 2015

Species of bacterium

Eleftheria terrae is a recently discovered Gram-negative bacterium. E. terrae is a temporary name for the organism, as it was only discovered in 2014 and is still undergoing scientific study. It was found to produce a previously unknown antibiotic named teixobactin. The discovery of E. terrae could represent a new age of antibiotics, as teixobactin is the first new antibiotic discovered since the synthetic era of the 1980s. Prior research has indicated that other uncultivable bacteria like E. terrae have potential in the development of new antimicrobial agents.

== Discovery ==
As of 2015, an estimated 99% of bacterial species are uncultured and require advanced means, such as the iChip, to be isolated. E. terrae is one such bacterium affectionately named by scientists "microbial dark matter" cultivated by emerging scientific methods. A team from Novobiotic Pharmaceuticals led by L. Ling discovered Eleftheria terrae in the fall of 2014 in a field in Maine using a technique developed at Northeastern University called the iChip or isolation chip technique. The iChip is a small plastic block that contains 192 holes going through it. The holes are filled with a culture medium that are then inoculated with soil diluted to deposit only one bacterium in each hole. After depositing the bacterium in the holes the iChip is covered on both sides by a semipermeable membrane and put into a box of the original soil. The permeable membranes allow nutrients and growth factors from the soil to diffuse in and allow growth of only one species. Ling et al. screened approximately 10,000 iChip growth isolates for prospective antimicrobial activity, and E. terrae seemed to be hopeful. This technology has potential for discovering even more antibiotics by allowing labs to grow previously "unculturable" microorganisms.

== General characteristics ==
E. terrae is a Gram-negative bacterium which produces several novel antibiotics including teixobactin and clovibactin. E. terrae grows and produces antibacterial activity under many different growth conditions, but optimally in R4 fermentation broth. R4 fermentation broth consists of 10g glucose, 1g yeast extract, 0.1g casamino acids, 3g proline, 10g MgCl_{2}·6H_{2}O, 4g CaCl_{2}·2H_{2}O, 0.2g K_{2}SO_{4}, 5.6g TES free acid per liter of deionized H_{2}O at pH 7. E. terrae's metabolism and ecology have not yet been extensively documented.

== Phylogeny ==
E. terrae belongs to the class beta-proteobacteria. After sequencing the organism's genome it was concluded that E. terrae is a member of a previously unknown genus close in genetic makeup to Aquabacteria based upon its 16S rRNA gene sequencing and DNA-DNA hybridization performed by computer analysis. Organisms of the genus Aquabacteria had not been known to produce antibiotics until E. terrae´s discovery.

== Genomics ==
Ling and her team sequenced the genome of E. terrae and estimated it to be 6.6 Mbp in length, using an in house pipeline by TUCF Genomics. After the draft genome was assembled it was screened for sequences closely related to adenylation domains. Contigs that were found to code for teixobactin biosynthetic pathways were manually edited and placed in order. This allowed the combination of other contigs that were separately assembled. Any gaps that remained in the genome were filled using bridging fragments developed by PCR and Sanger sequencing. The gaps were closed using the same primers used in amplification.

== Antibiotic production ==
E. terrae's production of teixobactin is prominent because recent tests have revealed that teixobactin binds differently than most normally used antibiotics which makes it harder for the bacteria being attacked to develop resistance. Experiments performed by Ling et al. have shown teixobactin is capable of binding to lipid precursors of peptidoglycan, which makes up part of bacterial cell walls. The results did not show any resistance to teixobactin in the organisms that were studied, including Staphylococcus aureus and Mycobacterium tuberculosis. These findings indicate that teixobactin's target is not a protein, leading to the belief that the development of bacterial resistance to teixobactin is much less likely. These experiments also showed that teixobactin followed a similar mechanism of action as the antibiotic vancomycin that binds to the lipid II molecule in peptidoglycan precursors but, unlike vancomycin, teixobactin is capable of binding to modified lipid II molecules found in vancomycin resistant bacteria. Teixobactin's inhibition of peptidoglycan synthesis is further explained by Ling's finding of a buildup of undecaprenyl-N-acetylmuramic acid-pentapeptide, a crucial step in the biosynthesis of peptidoglycan. According to Ling's tests, teixobactin is capable of inhibiting peptidoglycan synthesis by binding to either lipid I, lipid II, and undecaprenyl pyrophosphate. Teixobactin also seemed to be specifically involved with peptidoglycan precursors rather than blocking enzyme activity.
