= Aspergillus unilateralis =

Scientific classification
- Kingdom: Fungi
- Division: Ascomycota
- Class: Eurotiomycetes
- Order: Eurotiales
- Family: Aspergillaceae
- Genus: Aspergillus
- Species: A. unilateralis

Binomial name
- Aspergillus unilateralis Thrower (1954)

Species of fungus

Aspergillus unilateralis is a species of fungus in the genus Aspergillus. It is from the Fumigati section. Several fungi from this section produce heat-resistant ascospores, and the isolates from this section are frequently obtained from locations where natural fires have previously occurred. The species was first described in 1954. It has been reported to produce aszonapyrones and mycophenolic acid.

== Growth and morphology ==
A. unilateralis has been cultivated on both Czapek yeast extract agar (CYA) plates and Malt Extract Agar Oxoid® (MEAOX) plates. The growth morphology of the colonies can be seen in the pictures below.

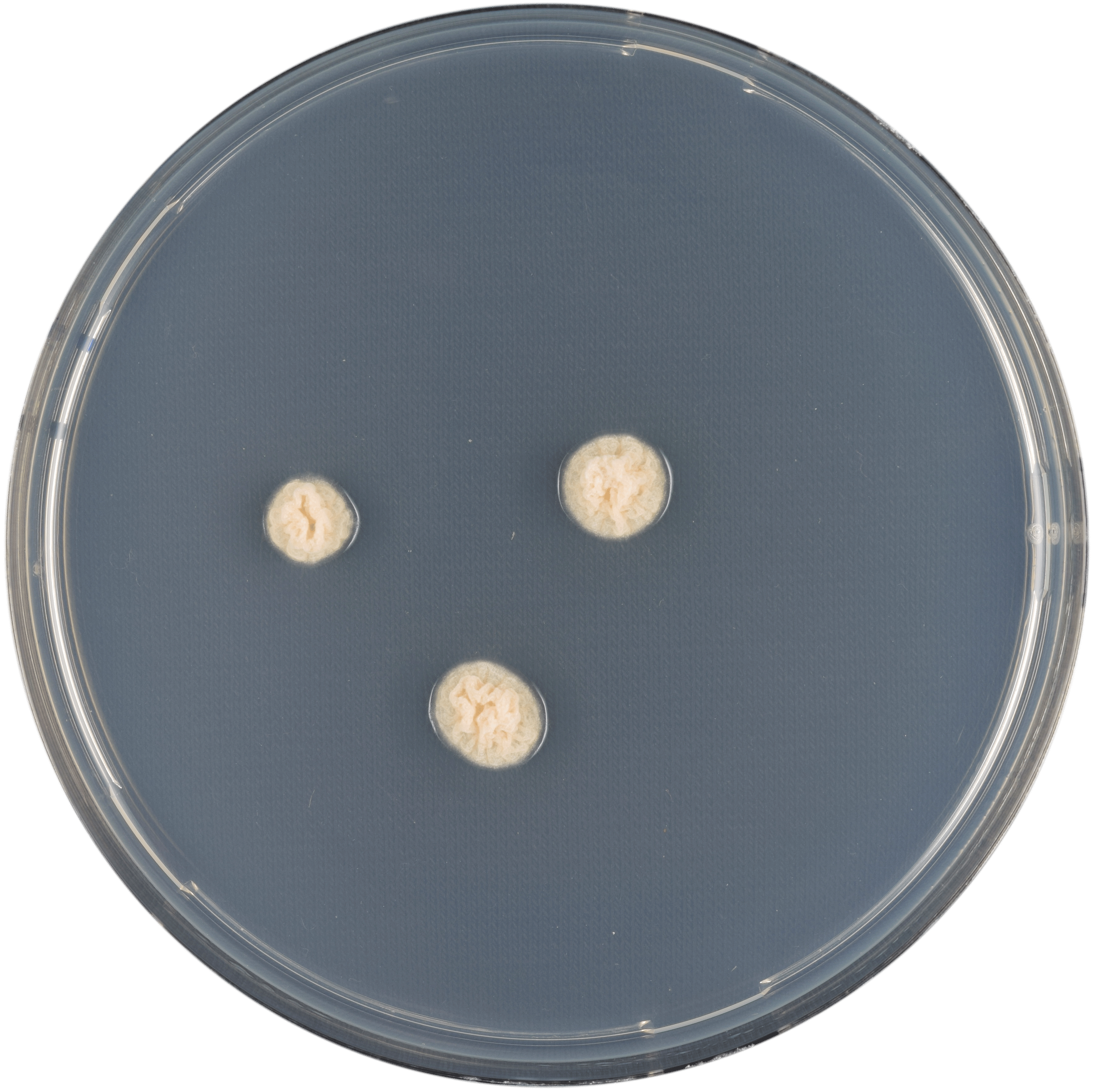
Aspergillus unilateralis growing on CYA plate

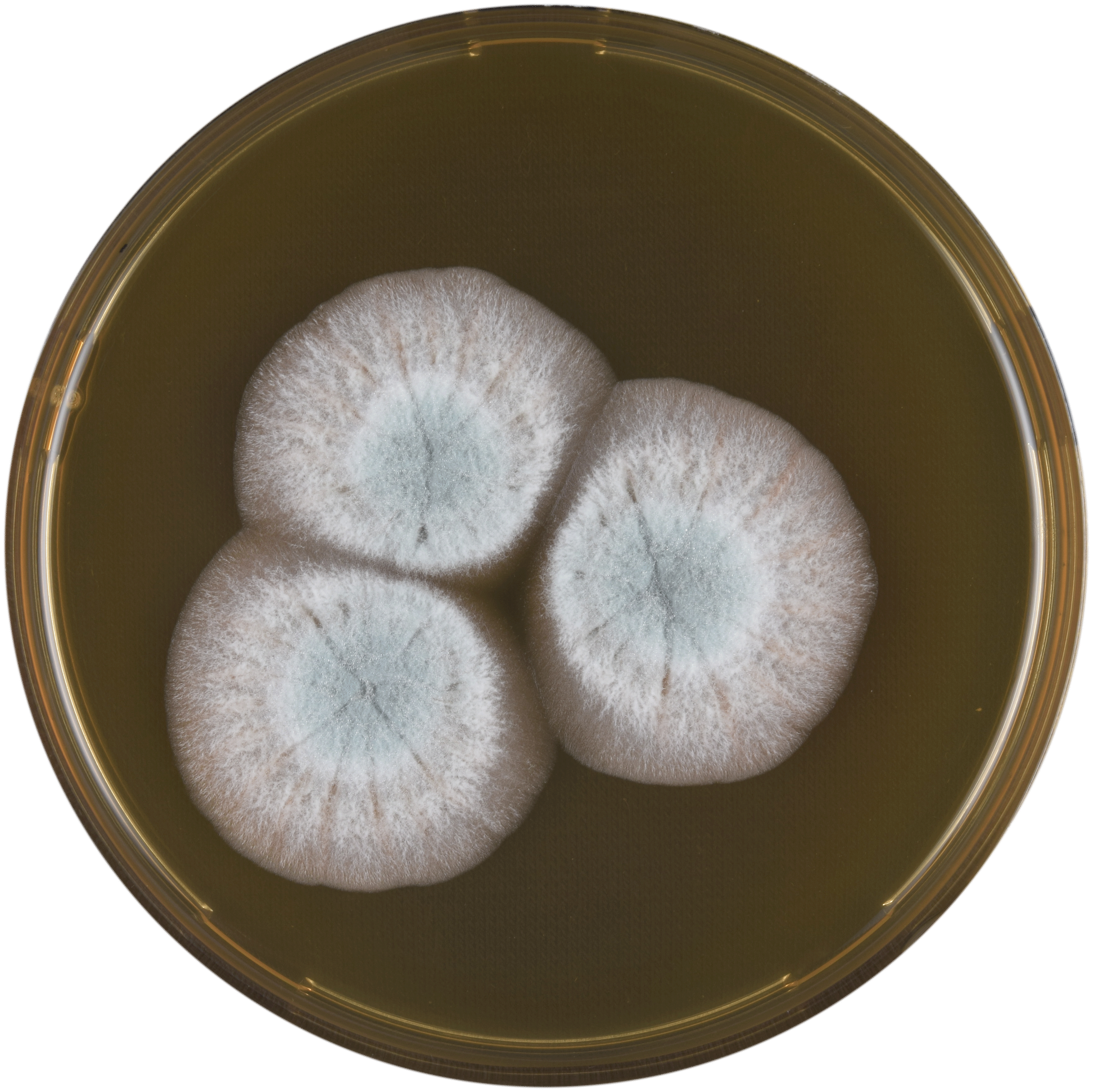
Aspergillus unilateralis growing on MEAOX plate
