= Enduracididine =

Names
- IUPAC name 3-[(4R)-2-Imino-4-imidazolidinyl]-L-alanine

Identifiers
| CAS Number | 21209-39-2 |
| 3D model (JSmol) | Interactive image |
| ChEBI | CHEBI:73969 |
| ChemSpider | 24775830 |
| KEGG | C20602 |
| PubChem CID | 15284838 |
| UNII | V9U5NAX243 |
| CompTox Dashboard (EPA) | DTXSID801032117 |
- InChI: InChI=1S/C6H12N4O2/c7-4(5(11)12)1-3-2-9-6(8)10-3/h3-4H,1-2,7H2,(H,11,12)(H3,8,9,10)/t3-,4+/m1/s1 Key: VFXRPXBQCNHQRQ-DMTCNVIQSA-N; InChI=1/C6H12N4O2/c7-4(5(11)12)1-3-2-9-6(8)10-3/h3-4H,1-2,7H2,(H,11,12)(H3,8,9,10)/t3-,4+/m1/s1 Key: VFXRPXBQCNHQRQ-DMTCNVIQBA
- SMILES: C1[C@H](NC(=N)N1)C[C@@H](C(=O)O)N

Properties
| Chemical formula | C_{6}H_{12}N_{4}O_{2} |
| Molar mass | 172.188 g·mol^{−1} |
- Except where otherwise noted, data are given for materials in their standard state (at 25 °C [77 °F], 100 kPa). Infobox references

Enduracididine is a non-proteinogenic α-amino acid that is a cyclic analogue of arginine. It is not genetically encoded into peptide sequences, but rather is generated as a posttranslational modification.

== Biological roles ==
Enduracididine occurs rarely in nature, appearing principally in peptide antibiotics such as the antibacterial compounds enramycin and teixobactin.
