= Adiponitrile =

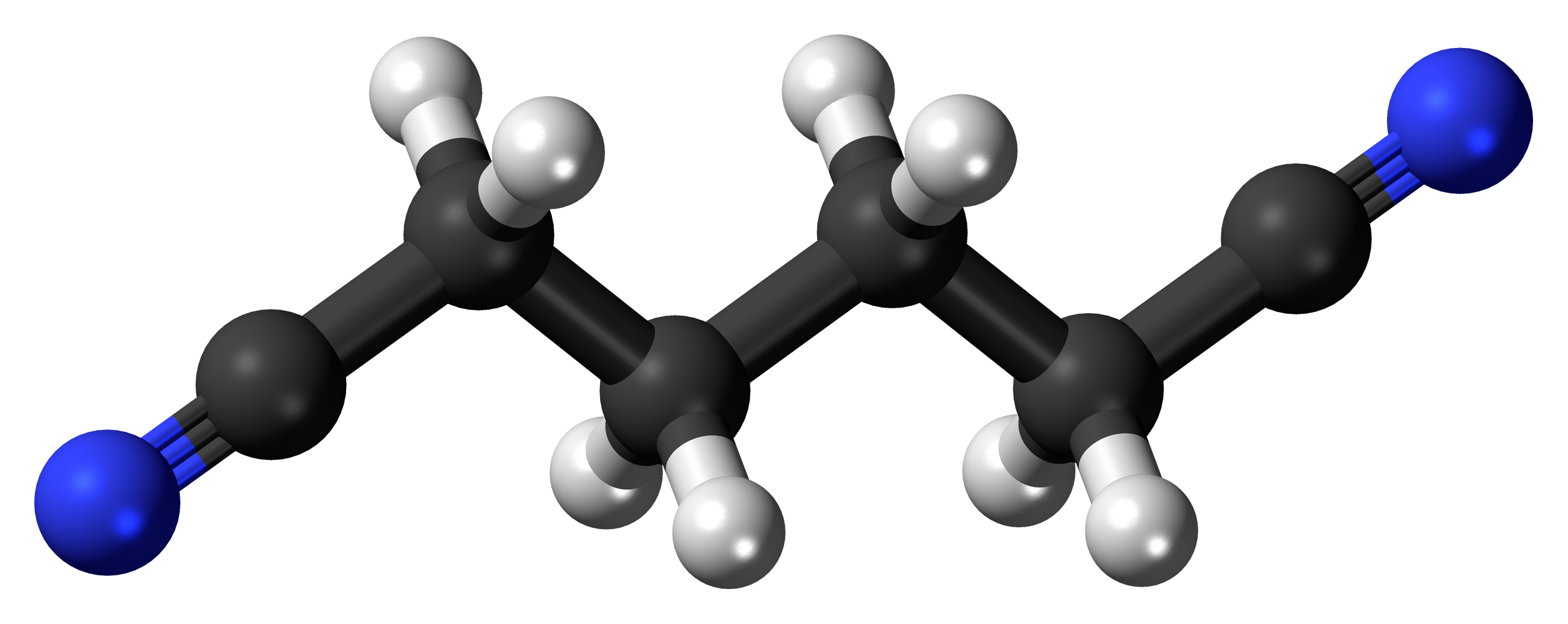

Names
- Preferred IUPAC name Hexanedinitrile
- Other names: Adipic acid dinitrile; Adipic acid nitrile; Adipyldinitrile; 1,4-Dicyanobutane; Hexanedioic acid dinitrile; Nitrile adipico; Tetramethylene cyanide; Tetramethylene dicyanide

Identifiers
| CAS Number | 111-69-3 |
| 3D model (JSmol) | Interactive image |
| Beilstein Reference | 1740005 |
| ChemSpider | 13876621 |
| ECHA InfoCard | 100.003.543 |
| EC Number | 203-896-3 |
| MeSH | adiponitrile |
| PubChem CID | 8128 |
| RTECS number | AV2625000 |
| UNII | SYT33B891I |
| UN number | 2205 |
| CompTox Dashboard (EPA) | DTXSID3021936 |
- InChI: InChI=1S/C6H8N2/c7-5-3-1-2-4-6-8/h1-4H2 Key: BTGRAWJCKBQKAO-UHFFFAOYSA-N
- SMILES: N#CCCCCC#N

Properties
| Chemical formula | C_{6}H_{8}N_{2} |
| Molar mass | 108.144 g·mol^{−1} |
| Appearance | Colourless liquid |
| Density | 951 mg mL^{−1} |
| Melting point | 1 to 3 °C; 34 to 37 °F; 274 to 276 K |
| Boiling point | 295.1 °C; 563.1 °F; 568.2 K |
| Solubility in water | 50 g/L (20 °C) |
| Vapor pressure | 300 mPa (at 20 °C) |
| Refractive index (n_{D}) | 1.438 |

Thermochemistry
| Std enthalpy of formation (Δ_{f}H^{⦵}_{298}) | 84.5–85.3 kJ mol^{−1} |

Hazards
- GHS labelling
| Pictograms | (GHS06: Toxic) |
| Signal word | Danger |
| Hazard statements | H301, H315, H319, H330, H335 |
| Precautionary statements | P260, P284, P301+P310, P305+P351+P338, P310 |
| NFPA 704 (fire diamond) | 4 2 1 |
| Flash point | 93 °C; 199 °F; 366 K (open cup) |
| Autoignition temperature | 550 °C (1,022 °F; 823 K) |
| Explosive limits | 1.7–4.99% |
- Lethal dose or concentration (LD, LC)
| LD_{50} (median dose) | 155 mg kg^{−1} (oral, rat) |
- NIOSH (US health exposure limits)
| PEL (Permissible) | none |
| REL (Recommended) | TWA 4 ppm (18 mg/m^{3}) |
| IDLH (Immediate danger) | N.D. |

Related compounds
| Related alkanenitriles | Glutaronitrile |
| Related compounds | hexanedioic acid hexanedihydrazide hexanedioyl dichloride hexanediamide 1,4-diisocyanobutane |
- Except where otherwise noted, data are given for materials in their standard state (at 25 °C [77 °F], 100 kPa). verify (what is ?) Infobox references

Adiponitrile is an organic compound with the chemical formula (CH_{2})_{4}(CN)_{2}. This viscous, colourless dinitrile is an important precursor to the polymer nylon 66. In 2005, about one million tonnes of adiponitrile were produced.

== Synthesis ==
=== Early methods ===
Because of the industrial value of adiponitrile, many methods have been developed for its synthesis. Early industrial methods started from furfural and later by the chlorination of butadiene to give 1,4-dichloro-2-butene, which with sodium cyanide, converts to 3-hexenedinitrile, which in turn can be hydrogenated to adiponitrile:

ClCH_{2}CH=CHCH_{2}Cl + 2 NaCN → NCCH_{2}CH=CHCH_{2}CN + 2 NaCl
NCCH_{2}CH=CHCH_{2}CN + H_{2} → NC(CH_{2})_{4}CN

Adiponitrile has also been produced from adipic acid, by dehydration of the diamide, but this is rarely employed.

=== Modern methods ===
After patent application in 2004, the majority of adiponitrile is prepared by the nickel-catalysed hydrocyanation of butadiene, as discovered at DuPont, pioneered by William C. Drinkard. The net reaction is:

CH_{2}=CHCH=CH_{2} + 2 HCN → NC(CH_{2})_{4}CN

The process involves several stages, the first of which involves monohydrocyanation (the addition of one molecule of HCN), affording isomers of pentenenitriles as well as 2- and 3-methylbutenenitriles. These unsaturated nitriles are subsequently isomerized to the 3-and 4-pentenenitriles. In the final stage, these pentenenitriles are subjected to a second hydrocyanation to produce adiponitrile, the anti-Markovnikov product, as well as 2-methylglutaronitrile, a useful byproduct.

Another side reaction is the alkene metathesis of 3-pentenenitrile to yield dicyanobutenes, which are readily hydrogenated to adiponitrile as described above.

The other major industrial method involves hydrodimerization, starting from acrylonitrile:

2 CH_{2}=CHCN + 2 e^{−} + 2 H^{+} → NCCH_{2}CH_{2}CH_{2}CH_{2}CN
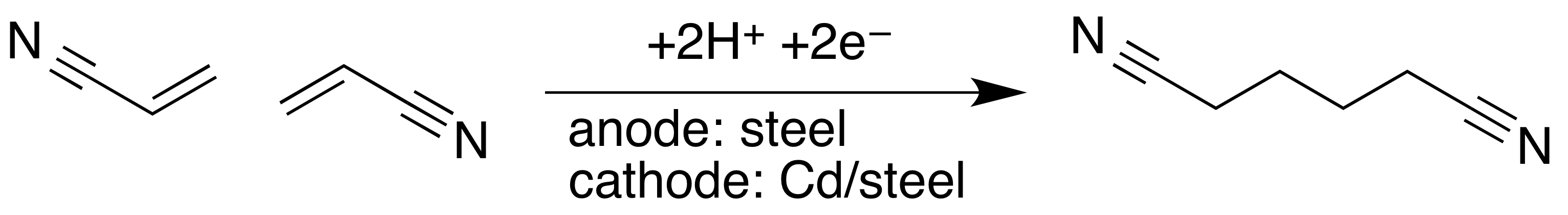

The electrolytic coupling of acrylonitrile was discovered at Monsanto Company.

== Applications ==
Almost all adiponitrile is hydrogenated to hexane-1,6-diamine for the production of nylon:

NC(CH_{2})_{4}CN + 4 H_{2} → H_{2}N(CH_{2})_{6}NH_{2}

Like other nitriles, adiponitrile is susceptible to hydrolysis; however, the resulting adipic acid is less expensively prepared via other routes.

== Production ==
In 2018, there existed approximately 1.5 million metric tons of capacity. The main producers of adiponitrile were:

- Ascend Performance Materials: Decatur, Alabama (US); 400 metric kilotons per year (kt/y), expanded to 580 kt/y by 2022
- Invista: Victoria, Texas and Orange, Texas, (US)
- Invista and BASF "Butachimie ADN plant": Chalampé (France); production to be increased from 100 kt/y in 2020 to 600 kt/y
- Asahi Kasei (Japan)

BASF closed the 128 kt/y ADN plant at Seal Sands in 2009.

In 2015, the Shandong Runxing New Material 100 kt/y plant suffered an explosion and was not reopened. In 2022, Invista plans to open a 300–400 kt/y plant in Shanghai.

== Safety ==
The LD_{50} (median lethal dose) of adiponitrile is 300 mg/kg for oral ingestion by rats.

In 1990, ACGIH adopted a time-weighted average Threshold Limit Value of 2ppm for work-related skin exposure.

The NIOSH recommended skin exposure limit for a work-related time weighted average concentration is 4ppm (18 mg/m^{3}).

Adiponitrile is classified as an extremely hazardous substance in the United States as defined in Section 302 of the U.S. Emergency Planning and Community Right-to-Know Act (42 U.S.C. 11002), and is subject to strict reporting requirements by facilities which produce, store, or use it in significant quantities.
