= Dioctyl adipate =

Chemical compound (CH2CH2CO2C8H17)2

Names
- Preferred IUPAC name Di(octyl) hexanedioate
- Other names Di-n-octyl adipate

Identifiers
CAS Number	123-79-5
3D model (JSmol)	Interactive image
ChemSpider	29011
ECHA InfoCard	100.004.231
EC Number	204-652-9
PubChem CID	31271
UNII	2BD76YG9SI
CompTox Dashboard (EPA)	DTXSID2021606
- InChI: InChI=1S/C22H42O4/c1-3-5-7-9-11-15-19-25-21(23)17-13-14-18-22(24)26-20-16-12-10-8-6-4-2/h3-20H2,1-2H3 Key: NEHDRDVHPTWWFG-UHFFFAOYSA-N; InChI=1/C22H42O4/c1-3-5-7-9-11-15-19-25-21(23)17-13-14-18-22(24)26-20-16-12-10-8-6-4-2/h3-20H2,1-2H3 Key: NEHDRDVHPTWWFG-UHFFFAOYAJ
- SMILES: O=C(OCCCCCCCC)CCCCC(=O)OCCCCCCCC

Properties
Chemical formula	C_{22}H_{42}O_{4}
Molar mass	370.574 g·mol^{−1}
Appearance	Colourless to yellowish liquid
Density	0.98 g/mL
Melting point	−7.48 °C (18.54 °F; 265.67 K)
Boiling point	404.84 °C (760.71 °F; 677.99 K)
Solubility in water	0.78 mg/L (22 °C)

Hazards
- GHS labelling
Pictograms	(GHS07: Exclamation mark)
Signal word	Warning
Hazard statements	H315, H319
Precautionary statements	P264, P264+P265, P280, P302+P352, P305+P351+P338, P321, P332+P317, P337+P317, P362+P364
- Lethal dose or concentration (LD, LC)
LD_{50} (median dose)	9110 mg/kg (rat, oral)
- Except where otherwise noted, data are given for materials in their standard state (at 25 °C [77 °F], 100 kPa). verify (what is ?) Infobox references

Dioctyl adipate (DOA) is an organic compound with the formula (CH_{2}CH_{2}CO_{2}C_{8}H_{17})_{2}. It is a colorless oily liquid . As well as related diesters derived from 2-ethylhexanol, decanol, isodecanol, etc., it is used as a plasticizer.

DEHA is sometimes incorrectly called dioctyl adipate. The abbreviation DOA has also been used for bis(2-ethylhexyl) adipate (CAS # 103-23-1).

== Toxicity ==
Esters of adipic acid exhibit low acute toxicities in animal models. The LD_{50} of the related ethylhexanoate is estimated at 900 mg/kg (rat, i.v.).
