= Streptomyces albus =

Scientific classification
- Domain: Bacteria
- Kingdom: Bacillati
- Phylum: Actinomycetota
- Class: Actinomycetes
- Order: Streptomycetales
- Family: Streptomycetaceae
- Genus: Streptomyces
- Species: S. albus

Binomial name
- Streptomyces albus (Rossi Doria 1891) Waksman and Henrici 1943 (Approved Lists 1980)

Synonyms
- "Actinomyces almquisti" Duché 1934; "Actinomyces flocculus" Duché 1934; "Actinomyces gibsonii" Erikson 1935; "Actinomyces rangoon" Erikson 1935; Streptomyces almquistii (Duché 1934) Pridham et al. 1958 (Approved Lists 1980); Streptomyces flocculus (Duché 1934) Waksman and Henrici 1948 (Approved Lists 1980); Streptomyces gibsonii (Erikson 1935) Waksman and Henrici 1948 (Approved Lists 1980); Streptomyces rangoon (Erikson 1935) Pridham et al. 1958 (Approved Lists 1980); Streptomyces rangoonensis corrig. (Erikson 1935) Pridham et al. 1958 (Approved Lists 1980)

Species of bacterium

Streptomyces albus is a bacterial species from which the pseudodisaccharide aminoglycoside salbostatin was isolated. S. albus is known to produce white aerial mycelium.
