= Sodium adipate =

Names
- Preferred IUPAC name Disodium hexanedioate
- Other names Disodium adipate Adipic acid, sodium salt

Identifiers
CAS Number	7486-38-6
3D model (JSmol)	Interactive image
ChemSpider	22505
ECHA InfoCard	100.028.448
E number	E356 (antioxidants, ...)
PubChem CID	24073
UNII	3XG6T5KYKM
CompTox Dashboard (EPA)	DTXSID1044726
- InChI: InChI=1S/C6H10O4.2Na/c7-5(8)3-1-2-4-6(9)10;;/h1-4H2,(H,7,8)(H,9,10);;/q;2*+1/p-2 Key: KYKFCSHPTAVNJD-UHFFFAOYSA-L
- SMILES: [Na+].[Na+].[O-]C(=O)CCCCC(=O)[O-]

Properties
Chemical formula	C_{6}H_{8}Na_{2}O_{4}
Molar mass	190.106 g·mol^{−1}
Appearance	Solid white to off-white powder or crystals

Hazards
- GHS labelling
Pictograms	(GHS07: Exclamation mark)
Signal word	Warning
Hazard statements	H302, H315, H319, H335
Precautionary statements	P261, P305+P351+P338
NFPA 704 (fire diamond)	1 0 0
- Lethal dose or concentration (LD, LC)
LD_{50} (median dose)	4000 mg/kg (intraperitoneal, mouse)
- Safety data sheet (SDS)
- Except where otherwise noted, data are given for materials in their standard state (at 25 °C [77 °F], 100 kPa). verify (what is ?) Infobox references

Sodium adipate is a chemical organic compound with formula Na_{2}C_{6}H_{8}O_{4}. It is the sodium salt of adipic acid.

As a food additive, it has the E number E356 as is used as a buffering agent and as an acidity regulator.

== Preparation ==
Sodium adipate is prepared by reacting adipic acid with sodium hydroxide:

C_{6}H_{10}O_{4} + 2 NaOH → Na_{2}C_{6}H_{8}O_{4} + 2 H_{2}O

== Safety ==
If consumed in excess, it can lead to high levels of sodium and gastrointestinal problems. It can also cause allergic reactions which may lead to swelling, itching, difficulty breathing. Sodium adipate has no proven health benefits.
