= 1,4-Diisocyanobutane =

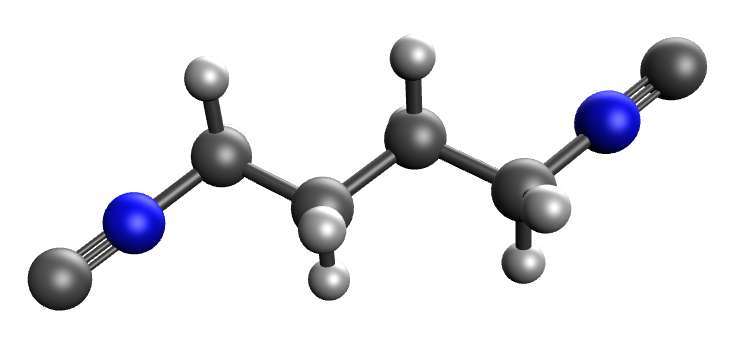

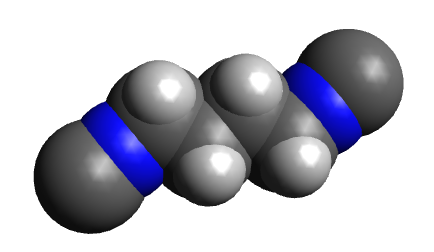
1,4-diisocyanobutane

Names
- Preferred IUPAC name 1,4-Diisocyanobutane

Identifiers
CAS Number	929-25-9
3D model (JSmol)	Interactive image
ChemSpider	3442746
PubChem CID	4233940
- InChI: InChI=1S/C6H8N2/c1-7-5-3-4-6-8-2/h3-6H2 Key: SEIOPNFVJBEBMP-UHFFFAOYSA-N; InChI=1S/C6H8N2/c1-7-5-3-4-6-8-2/h3-6H2 Key: SEIOPNFVJBEBMP-UHFFFAOYSA-N
- SMILES: [C-]#[N+]CCCC[N+]#[C-]

Properties
Chemical formula	C_{6}H_{8}N_{2}
Molar mass	108.144 g·mol^{−1}

Hazards
- GHS labelling
Pictograms	(GHS06: Toxic)
Signal word	Danger
Hazard statements	H301, H311, H331
Precautionary statements	P261, P264, P270, P271, P280, P301+P316, P302+P352, P304+P340, P316, P321, P330, P361+P364, P403+P233, P405, P501

Related compounds
Related compounds	Adiponitrile
- Except where otherwise noted, data are given for materials in their standard state (at 25 °C [77 °F], 100 kPa). verify (what is ?) Infobox references

1,4-Diisocyanobutane is an organic compound. Its structural formula is CN(CH_{2})_{4}NC, which similar to adiponitrile but with carbon and nitrogen of cyanide groups switching places. It has been used as a ligand in the formation of organometallic complexes, such as with rhodium - [Rh_{2}(CNC_{8}H_{14}NC)_{4}]^{2+}.
