= Tetramethylazodicarboxamide =

Names
- IUPAC name 3-(Dimethylcarbamoylimino)-1,1-dimethylurea
- Other names Diamide; Tetramethyldiazenedicarboxamide; N,N,N′,N′-Tetramethylazoformamide 1,1'-Azobis(N,N-dimethylformamide); N,N,N′,N′-Tetramethylazobisformamide; Azodicarboxylic acid bis(dimethylamide); 1,1'-Azobis(N,N-dimethylformamide)

Identifiers
CAS Number	10465-78-8
3D model (JSmol)	Interactive image
Abbreviations	TMAD
ChEBI	CHEBI:48958
ChemSpider	4510221
ECHA InfoCard	100.030.852
EC Number	233-951-7
PubChem CID	4278
UNII	86EQC90W32
CompTox Dashboard (EPA)	DTXSID6040456
- InChI: InChI=1S/C6H12N4O2/c1-9(2)5(11)7-8-6(12)10(3)4/h1-4H3/b8-7+ Key: VLSDXINSOMDCBK-BQYQJAHWSA-N
- SMILES: CN(C)C(=O)N=NC(=O)N(C)C

Properties
Chemical formula	C_{6}H_{12}N_{4}O_{2}
Molar mass	172.188 g·mol^{−1}
Appearance	Yellow crystalline solid
Melting point	113 to 115 °C (235 to 239 °F; 386 to 388 K)
- Except where otherwise noted, data are given for materials in their standard state (at 25 °C [77 °F], 100 kPa). verify (what is ?) Infobox references

Tetramethylazodicarboxamide (also known as TMAD and diamide) is a reagent used in biochemistry for oxidation of thiols in proteins to disulfides. It has also been used as a reagent in the Mitsunobu reaction in place of diethyl azodicarboxylate.
