= Teixobactin =

Chemical compound

Clinical data
- ATC code: none

Legal status
- Legal status: In general: unscheduled

Pharmacokinetic data
- Bioavailability: Unknown
- Protein binding: Unknown
- Metabolism: Unknown
- Onset of action: Unknown
- Elimination half-life: Unknown
- Excretion: Unknown

Identifiers
- IUPAC name: (2R)-N-[(2R,3S)-1-[[(2S,3S)-1-[[(2S)-1-[[(3S,6S,9S,12R,13S)-6-[[(5S)-2-amino-4,5-dihydro-1H-imidazol-5-yl]methyl]-3-[(2S)-butan-2-yl]-9,13-dimethyl-2,5,8,11-tetraoxo-1-oxa-4,7,10-triazacyclotridec-12-yl]amino]-3-hydroxy-1-oxopropan-2-yl]amino]-3-methyl-1-oxopentan-2-yl]amino]-3-methyl-1-oxopentan-2-yl]-2-[[(2S)-3-hydroxy-2-[[(2S,3S)-3-methyl-2-[[(2R)-2-(methylamino)-3-phenylpropanoyl]amino]pentanoyl]amino]propanoyl]amino]pentanediamide
- CAS Number: 1613225-53-8
- PubChem CID: 86341926
- ChemSpider: 32786764
- UNII: LC730GUE72
- ChEBI: CHEBI:84192

Chemical and physical data
- Formula: C_{58}H_{95}N_{15}O_{15}
- Molar mass: 1242.488 g·mol^{−1}
- 3D model (JSmol): Interactive image
- SMILES: CC[C@H](C)[C@H]1C(=O)O[C@H]([C@H](C(=O)N[C@H](C(=O)N[C@H](C(=O)N1)C[C@H]2CNC(=N)N2)C)NC(=O)[C@H](CO)NC(=O)[C@H]([C@@H](C)CC)NC(=O)[C@@H]([C@@H](C)CC)NC(=O)[C@@H](CCC(=O)N)NC(=O)[C@H](CO)NC(=O)[C@H]([C@@H](C)CC)NC(=O)[C@@H](Cc3ccccc3)NC)C
- InChI: InChI=1/C58H95N15O15/c1-12-28(5)42(70-49(79)37(61-11)23-34-19-17-16-18-20-34)53(83)67-39(26-74)51(81)65-36(21-22-41(59)76)48(78)69-44(30(7)14-3)55(85)71-43(29(6)13-2)54(84)68-40(27-75)52(82)73-46-33(10)88-57(87)45(31(8)15-4)72-50(80)38(24-35-25-62-58(60)64-35)66-47(77)32(9)63-56(46)86/h16-20,28-33,35-40,42-46,61,74-75H,12-15,21-27H2,1-11H3,(H2,59,76)(H,63,86)(H,65,81)(H,66,77)(H,67,83)(H,68,84)(H,69,78)(H,70,79)(H,71,85)(H,72,80)(H,73,82)(H3,60,62,64)/t28-,29-,30-,31-,32-,33-,35-,36+,37+,38-,39-,40-,42-,43-,44+,45-,46+/m0/s1

Teixobactin (/ˌteɪksoʊˈbæktɪn/) is a peptide-like secondary metabolite of some species of bacteria, that kills some gram-positive bacteria. It appears to belong to a new class of antibiotics, and harms bacteria by binding to lipid II and lipid III, important precursor molecules for forming the cell wall.

Teixobactin was discovered using a new method of culturing bacteria in soil, which allowed researchers to grow a previously unculturable bacterium now named Eleftheria terrae, which produces the antibiotic. Teixobactin was shown to kill Staphylococcus aureus and Mycobacterium tuberculosis.

== History ==
In January 2015, a collaboration of four institutes in the US and Germany together with two pharmaceutical companies, reported that they had isolated and characterized a new antibiotic, killing "without detectable resistance." Teixobactin was discovered by screening previously unculturable bacteria present in a sample of soil from "a grassy field in Maine," using the isolation chip (iChip).

The multiple independent iChip culture cells in a block of plastic are inoculated with soil diluted to deposit about one bacterium in each cell, and then sealed with semi-permeable membranes. The iChip is then planted in a box of the soil of origin. Nutrients and growth factors diffusing from the ambient soil into each culture cell through the membranes nurture growth of the bacterium into a colony that is then self-sustaining in vitro. This arrangement allows growth of only one species in some of the cells.

Tests for antibacterial activity against Staphylococcus aureus highlighted a previously undescribed bacterium which was named Eleftheria terrae. It was found to be producing a new antibiotic compound that the researchers named teixobactin. Its absolute stereochemistry was determined employing techniques that included chemical degradation with advanced Marfey's analysis as well as partial degradation, synthesis of fragments obtained by degradation and the synthesis of all four diastereomers of an unusual amino acid not occurring in proteins.

Teixobactin is the first novel antibiotic with drug potential isolated from bacteria in decades. It appears to represent a new class of antibiotics, raising hopes that the new isolation techniques employed could lead to further antibiotic discoveries.

== Biosynthesis ==
Teixobactin is an 11-residue, macrocyclic depsipeptide hypothesized by its discoverers to be synthesized in E. terrae by the nonribosomal peptide synthetases Txo1 and Txo2 (encoded by the genes txo1 and txo2). The peptide has several unusual features, including four D-amino acids, a methylated phenylalanine, and the non-proteinogenic α-amino acid enduracididine. The amino acid sequence of teixobactin is MeHN—d-Phe—Ile—Ser——d-Gln—d-Ile—Ile—Ser—d-Thr*—Ala—enduracididine—Ile—COO—*. The carboxy terminus forms a lactone with the l-threonine residue (indicated by the asterisk), as is common in microbial nonribosomal peptides. This lactone-forming ring closure reaction is catalyzed by two C-terminal thioesterase domains of Txo2, forming a lactone. Txo1 and Txo2 are together composed of 11 modules, and each module is thought to sequentially add one amino acid to a growing peptide chain. The first module has a methyltransferase domain that methylates the N-terminal phenylalanine.

== Antibacterial activity ==
=== Mechanism of action ===
Teixobactin is an inhibitor of cell wall synthesis. It acts primarily by binding to lipid II, a precursor to peptidoglycan. In addition to inhibiting cell wall synthesis, teixobactin's capacity to form large supramolecular fibrils upon lipid II binding compromises the integrity of the bacterial membrane, contributing to the killing mechanism. The incorporation of D- and L- amino acids enables allocating teixobactin's hydrophobic residues onto the bacterial membrane surface. Lipid II is also targeted by the antibiotic vancomycin. The binding of teixobactin to lipid precursors inhibits the production of the peptidoglycan layer, leading to lysis of vulnerable bacteria.

=== Activity ===
Teixobactin was reported to be potent in vitro against all gram-positive bacteria tested, including Staphylococcus aureus and difficult-to-treat enterococci, with Clostridioides difficile and Bacillus anthracis being exceptionally vulnerable. It also killed Mycobacterium tuberculosis. It was also found to be effective in vivo, when used to treat mice infected with methicillin-resistant S. aureus (MRSA), and Streptococcus pneumoniae. The dose required to achieve 50% survival against MRSA is only 10% of the PD_{50} dose of vancomycin, an antibiotic typically used for MRSA.

It is not active against bacteria with an outer membrane such as gram negative pathogens, particularly carbapenem resistant enterobacteriaceae, or those with New Delhi metallo-beta-lactamase 1 (NDM1).

=== Induction of resistance ===
No resistant strain of S. aureus or M. tuberculosis was generated in vitro when administering sublethal doses, for as long as 27 days in the case of the former. It is postulated that teixobactin is more robust against mutation of the target pathogens, because of its unusual antibiotic mechanism of binding to less mutable fatty molecules rather than binding to relatively mutable proteins in the bacterial cell. However, several scientists caution that it is too early to conclude that teixobactin resistance would not develop in the clinical setting. Similar claims were made for vancomycin, yet resistance emerged soon after large-scale use in the 1980s. It is possible that genes encoding resistance to teixobactin are already present in soil bacteria. Resistance could also arise by mutation after prolonged use in patients.

== Society and culture ==
NovoBiotic Pharmaceuticals has been issued two US patents on teixobactin (US Patents 9,163,065 and 9,402,878). Northeastern University, where Kim Lewis, the senior author of the article in Nature, works, filed a patent on the method used to discover teixobactin, and licensed it to NovoBiotic in 2003; Lewis is a consultant to the company.

== Research ==
In 2016 researchers synthesized the compound and used it to treat a bacterial infection in mice.

== See also ==
- Antibiotic resistance
- Clovibactin
- Pseudouridimycin
