= Bisphenol =

Class of chemical compounds

The bisphenols (/ˈbɪsfɪnɒl/) are a group of industrial chemical compounds related to diphenylmethane; commonly used in the production of plastics and epoxy resins. They feature two hydroxyphenyl groups linked by a methylene bridge. Also included are bisphenol S, P, and M. "Bisphenol" is a common name; the letter following denotes the variant, which depends on the additional substituents. Bisphenol A is the most common representative of the group, with millions of metric tons produced globally in the past decade, often simply called "bisphenol".

Bisphenols have attracted controversy because of their role as endocrine disruptors. Their estrogenic properties are weak, but the scale of their production is considerable.

== Partial inventory of bisphenols ==
Structural formula	Name	CAS	Reactants	
Bisphenol A	Bisphenol A	80-05-7	Phenol	Acetone
Bisphenol AP	Bisphenol AP	1571-75-1	Phenol	Acetophenone
Bisphenol AF	Bisphenol AF	1478-61-1	Phenol	Hexafluoroacetone
Bisphenol B	Bisphenol B	77-40-7	Phenol	Butanone
Bisphenol BP	Bisphenol BP	1844-01-5	Phenol	Benzophenone
Bisphenol C	Bisphenol C	79-97-0	o-cresol	Acetone
Bisphenol CII	Bisphenol C 2	14868-03-2	Phenol	Chloral
Bisphenol E	Bisphenol E	2081-08-5	Phenol	Ethanal
Bisphenol F	Bisphenol F	620-92-8	Phenol	Formaldehyde
Bisphenol G	Bisphenol G	127-54-8	2-Isopropylphenol	Acetone
Bisphenol M	Bisphenol M	13595-25-0		
Bisphenol S	Bisphenol S	80-09-1	Phenol	Sulfur trioxide
Bisphenol P	Bisphenol P	2167-51-3		
Bisphenol PH	Bisphenol PH	24038-68-4	2-Phenylphenol	Acetone
Bisphenol TMC	Bisphenol TMC	129188-99-4	Phenol	3,3,5-Trimethylcyclohexanone
Bisphenol Z	Bisphenol Z	843-55-0	Phenol	Cyclohexanone
Dinitrobisphenol A	Dinitrobisphenol A	5329-21-5	Bisphenol A	Nitric acid
Tetrabromobisphenol A	Tetrabromobisphenol A	79-94-7	Bisphenol A	Bromine
Tetramethylbisphenol F	Tetramethyl bisphenol F	5384-21-4	2,6-Xylenol	Formaldehyde

== Health effects ==
Many bisphenols, including Bisphenols A (BPA), F (BPF) and S (BPS), have been shown to be endocrine disruptors, potentially relating to adverse health effects. Other implicated health effects include obesity and metabolic disorders. The threat is of interest because the chemical is pervasive in everyday life, including food and through the use of thermal paper.

=== Occurrence in humans ===
Bisphenols have monitored in humans through analysis of serum and urine. Workers who manufacture BPA-based thermal paper have high BPA levels. BPS and BPF levels are elevated among workers dismantling e-waste in China. Many analogues of BPA, such as bisphenol F (BPF), bisphenol S (BPS), bisphenol AP (BPAP), bisphenol AF (BPAF), bisphenol FL (BPFL), and bisphenol C (BPC) are less studied with respect to their hormone-disrupting potential and other health effects.

=== Biodegradation ===
Due to its high production volumes, BPA has been characterised as "pseudo-persistent", leading to its spreading and potential accumulation in a variety of environmental matrices. BPA has a fairly short half-life. A number of aerobic organisms degrade BPA.

=== Precautions to reduce occupational exposures ===
Engineering controls to reduce exposure in the workplace have been applied such as process enclosure, local exhaust ventilation, and isolation of bisphenol-handling areas lower airborne and surface contamination in workplaces where bisphenols are used.

=== Exposure to bisphenol ===
Because bisphenol is largely used in everyday life such as in plastics, protective coating of packages, inner lining of food containers, and thermal paper of receipts, it can enter the body through multiple pathways (skin absorption, ingestion and inhalation).

== Exposure pathways ==
=== Dietary exposure ===
The main pathway of exposure is through ingestion of food that is contaminated with bisphenol. Bisphenol can leach slowly into the food from surfaces such as the inside lining of cans, plastic containers, packages, disposable tableware, and through wear and tear. This means that eating foods or drinking beverages that came in contact with products made from bisphenol could result in exposure. Studies have found bisphenol residue in foods and beverages even when using containers that claimed to be "bisphenol free".

=== Dermal (skin) exposure ===
Bisphenol can also enter the body through the skin via absorption and can result in skin irritation or allergic reactions in some individuals. One well-known example is the handling of store receipts, which are often coated with bisphenol, and can transfer from the skin of the hands to the mouth, resulting in ingestion of the chemical. Workers who handle receipts regularly, like cashiers and retail employees, may face higher dermal exposure.

=== Inhalation exposure ===
Due to its volatility, bisphenol does not easily evaporate into the air at room temperature according to its chemical properties. However, bisphenol can attach to dust and small particles in the environment and be inhaled. Usually, inhalation exposure of bisphenol are more common under industrial and manufacture settings.
