= Health effects of Bisphenol A =

Controversy related to consumer products

Chemical structure of bisphenol A(BPA).

Bisphenol A controversy centers on concerns and debates about the biomedical significance of bisphenol A (BPA), which is a precursor to polymers that are used in some consumer products, including some food containers. The concerns began with the hypothesis that BPA is an endocrine disruptor; it mimics endocrine hormones and thus has the unintended and possibly far-reaching effects on humans in physical contact with the chemical.

Since 2008, several governments have investigated its safety, which prompted some retailers to withdraw polycarbonate products. The U.S. Food and Drug Administration (FDA) ended its authorization of the use of BPA in baby bottles and infant formula packaging, based on market abandonment, not safety. The European Union and Canada have banned BPA use in baby bottles.

The U.S. FDA states "BPA is safe at the current levels occurring in foods" based on extensive research, including two more studies issued by the agency in early 2014. The European Food Safety Authority (EFSA) reviewed new scientific information on BPA in 2008, 2009, 2010, 2011 and 2015: EFSA's experts concluded on each occasion that they could not identify any new evidence which would lead them to revise their opinion that the known level of exposure to BPA is safe; however, the EFSA does recognize some uncertainties, and will continue to investigate them.

In February 2016, France announced that it intends to propose BPA as a REACH Regulation candidate substance of very high concern (SVHC). The European Chemicals Agency agreed to the proposal in June 2017.

== Production ==
The BPA controversy has gained momentum because of the quantity of BPA produced by the chemical industry. World production capacity of BPA was 1 million tons in the 1980s, and more than 2.2 million tons in 2009. It is a high production volume chemical. In 2003, U.S. consumption was 856,000 tons, 72% of which used to make polycarbonate plastic and 21% going into epoxy resins. In the U.S., less than 5% of the BPA produced is used in food contact applications, but remains in the canned food industry and printing applications such as sales receipts. On 20 February 2018, Packaging Digest reported that "At least 90%" of food cans no longer contained BPA.

Some type 7 plastics may contain bisphenol A

== Occurrence ==
BPA is rarely encountered in industrial products: it is invariably bound in a polymeric structure. Concerns therefore about exposure focus on the degradation, mainly by hydrolysis, of these polymers and the plastic objects derived therefrom.

Polycarbonate plastic, which is formed from BPA, is used to make a variety of common products including baby and water bottles, sports equipment, medical and dental devices, dental fillings sealants, CDs and DVDs, household electronics, eyeglass lenses, foundry castings, and the lining of water pipes.

BPA is also used in the synthesis of polysulfones and polyether ketones, as an antioxidant in some plasticizers, and as a polymerization inhibitor in PVC. Epoxy resins derived from bisphenol A are used as coatings on the inside of almost all food and beverage cans; however, due to BPA health concerns, in Japan epoxy coating was mostly replaced by PET film.

Bisphenol A is a preferred color developer in carbonless copy paper and thermal point of sale receipt paper. When used in thermal paper, BPA is present as "free" (i.e., discrete, non-polymerized) BPA, which is likely to be more available for exposure than BPA polymerized into a resin or plastic. Upon handling, BPA in thermal paper can be transferred to skin, and there is some concern that residues on hands could be ingested through incidental hand-to-mouth contact. Furthermore, some studies suggest that dermal absorption may contribute some small fraction to the overall human exposure. European data indicate that the use of BPA in paper may also contribute to the presence of BPA in the stream of recycled paper and in landfills. Although there are no estimates for the amount of BPA used in thermal paper in the United States, in Western Europe, the volume of BPA reported to be used in thermal paper in 2005/2006 was 1,890 tonnes per year, while total production was estimated at 1,150,000 tonnes per year. (Figures taken from 2012 EPA draft paper.) Studies document potential spreading and accumulation of BPA in paper recycling, suggesting its presence for decades in paper recycling loop even after a hypothetical ban. Epoxy resin may or may not contain BPA, and is employed to bind gutta percha in some root canal procedures.

== Biomedical history ==
In the early 1930s, the British biochemist Edward Charles Dodds tested BPA as an artificial estrogen, but found it to be 37,000 times less effective than estradiol. Dodds eventually developed a structurally similar compound, diethylstilbestrol (DES), which was used as a synthetic estrogen drug in women and animals until it was banned due to its risk of causing cancer; the ban on use of DES in humans came in 1971 and in animals, in 1979. BPA was never used as a drug. BPA's ability to mimic the effects of natural estrogen derives from the similarity of phenol groups on both BPA and estradiol, which enable this synthetic molecule to trigger estrogenic pathways in the body. Typically phenol-containing molecules similar to BPA are known to exert weak estrogenic activities, thus it is also considered an endocrine disruptor (ED) and estrogenic chemical. Xenoestrogens is another category the chemical BPA fits under because of its capability to interrupt the network that regulates the signals which control the reproductive development in humans and animals.

In 1997, adverse effects of low-dose BPA exposure in laboratory animals were first proposed. Modern studies began finding possible connections to health issues caused by exposure to BPA during pregnancy and during development. See Public health regulatory history in the United States and Chemical manufacturers' reactions to bans. As of 2014, research and debates are ongoing as to whether BPA should be banned or not.

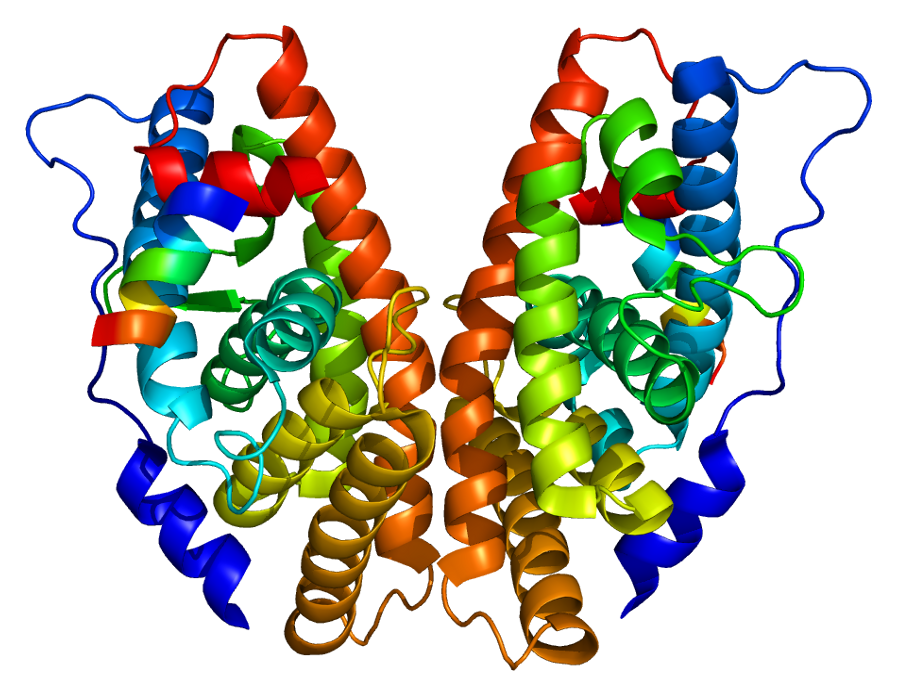
ERR-γ (modeled here) has been found in high concentration in the placenta, explaining reports of high bisphenol accumulation in this tissue.

A 2007 study investigated the interaction between bisphenol A's and estrogen-related receptor γ (ERR-γ). This orphan receptor (endogenous ligand unknown) behaves as a constitutive activator of transcription. BPA seems to bind strongly to ERR-γ (dissociation constant = 5.5 nM), but only weakly to the ER. BPA binding to ERR-γ preserves its basal constitutive activity. It can also protect it from deactivation from the SERM 4-hydroxytamoxifen (afimoxifene). This may be the mechanism by which BPA acts as a xenoestrogen. Different expression of ERR-γ in different parts of the body may account for variations in bisphenol A effects. For instance, ERR-γ has been found in high concentration in the placenta, explaining reports of high bisphenol accumulation in this tissue. BPA has also been found to act as an agonist of the GPER (GPR30).

== Safety ==
=== Health effects ===
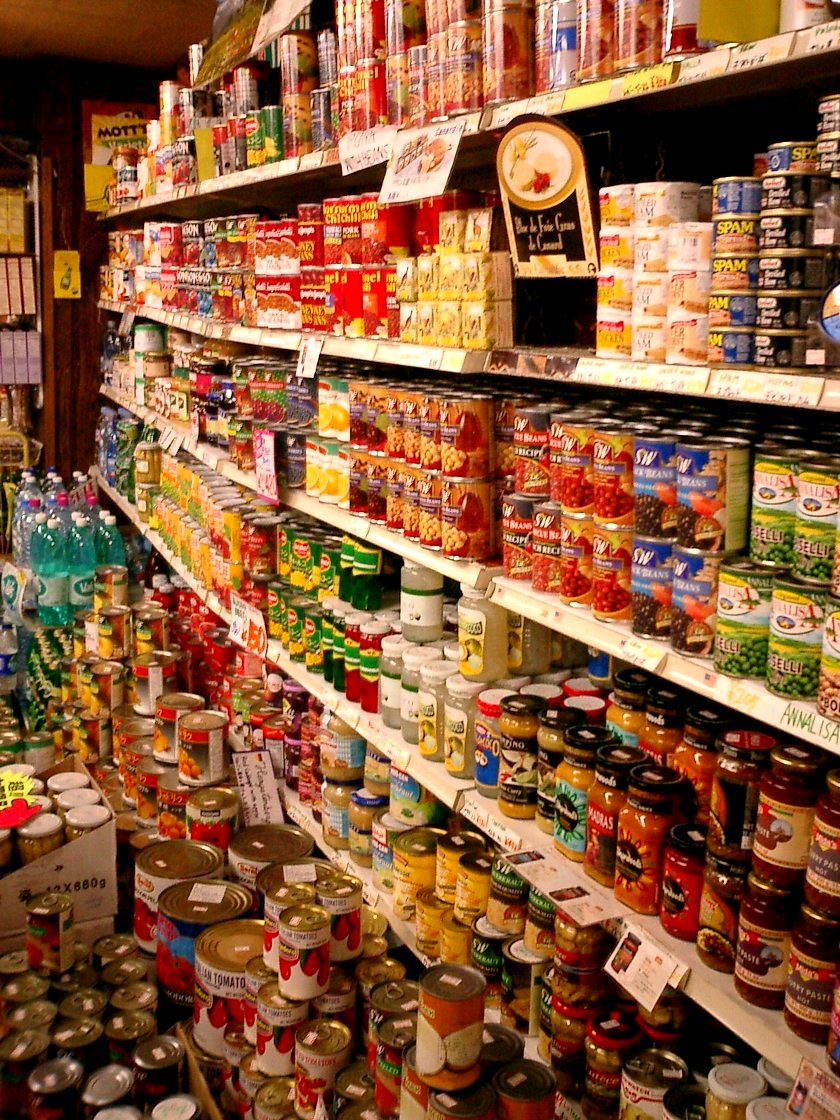
The largest exposure humans have to BPA is by mouth from such sources as food packaging, the epoxy lining of metal food and beverage cans, and plastic bottles.

In 2017 the European Chemicals Agency concluded that BPA should be listed as a substance of very high concern due to its properties as an endocrine disruptor. In 2023, the European Food Safety Authority re-evaluated the safety of BFA and significantly reduced tolerable daily intake (TDI) to 0.2 nanograms (0.2 billionths of a gram), 20,000 times lower than the previous TDI from 2015. The European Food Safety Authority concluded that consumers with both average and high exposure to BPA in all age groups exceeded the new TDI, indicating health concerns.

In 2012, the United States' Food and Drug Administration (FDA) banned the use of BPA in baby bottles intended for children under 12 months. The Natural Resources Defense Council called the move inadequate, saying the FDA needed to ban BPA from all food packaging. The FDA maintains that the agency continues to support the safety of BPA for use in products that hold food.

In 2011, Andrew Wadge, the chief scientist of the United Kingdom's Food Standards Agency, commented on a 2011 U.S. study on dietary exposure of adult humans to BPA, saying, "This corroborates other independent studies and adds to the evidence that BPA is rapidly absorbed, detoxified, and eliminated from humans – therefore is not a health concern."

The Endocrine Society said in 2015 that the results of ongoing laboratory research gave grounds for concern about the potential hazards of endocrine-disrupting chemicals – including BPA – in the environment, and that on the basis of the precautionary principle these substances should continue to be assessed and tightly regulated. A 2016 review of the literature said that the potential harms caused by BPA were a topic of scientific debate and that further investigation was a priority because of the association between BPA exposure and adverse human health effects including reproductive and developmental effects and metabolic disease.

==== United States expert panel conclusions ====
In 2007, the U.S. federal government invited experts to Chapel Hill, North Carolina to perform a scientific assessment of literature on BPA. Thirty-eight experts in fields involved with bisphenol A gathered in Chapel Hill, North Carolina to review several hundred studies on BPA, many conducted by members of the group. At the end of the meeting, the group issued the Chapel Hill Consensus Statement, which stated "BPA at concentrations found in the human body is associated with organizational changes in the prostate, breast, testis, mammary glands, body size, brain structure and chemistry, and behavior of laboratory animals."

The Chapel Hill Consensus Statement stated that average BPA levels in humans were above those that cause harm to many animals in laboratory experiments. It noted that while BPA is not persistent in the environment or in humans, biomonitoring surveys indicate that exposure is continuous. This is problematic because acute animal exposure studies are used to estimate daily human exposure to BPA, and no studies that had examined BPA pharmacokinetics in animal models had followed continuous low-level exposures.

The authors added that measurement of BPA levels in serum and other body fluids suggests the possibilities that BPA intake is much higher than accounted for or that BPA can bioaccumulate in some conditions (such as pregnancy). Following the Chapel Hill Statement, the US National Toxicology Program – Center for the Evaluation of Risks to Human Reproduction (NTP – CERHR), sponsored another literature assessment. The report, released in 2008, noted that "the possibility that bisphenol A may alter human development cannot be dismissed".

Despite this report, the US Food and Drug Administration (FDA) BPA Task Force (formed in April 2008), concluded that products containing BPA were safe. In 2009, the FDA Science Board Subcommittee on Bisphenol A, an external committee assigned to review the FDA's report "concluded that the FDA failed to conduct a rigorous or extensive exposure assessment", leading the US Environmental Protection Agency (EPA) to conduct their own assessment.

The United States Federal Interagency Working Group (FIW) included a goal to reduce BPA exposure in the 2 December 2010 release of their 2020 Healthy People national objectives for improving the health of all Americans.

=== Metabolic disease ===
Numerous animal studies have demonstrated an association between endocrine disrupting chemicals (including BPA) and obesity. However, the relationship between bisphenol A exposure and obesity in humans is unclear. Cohort studies have shown there has been an association of prenatal BPA exposure and increased body fat percentage at age 7 and increased BMI by age 9. Not all studies have shown a positive relationship between BPA exposure and obesity, further studies on the effects of BPA on metabolic diseases need to take diet into consideration to remove any influence it might have on the outcome. Proposed mechanisms for BPA exposure to increase the risk of obesity include BPA-induced thyroid dysfunction, activation of the PPAR-gamma receptor, and disruption of neural circuits that regulate feeding behavior. BPA works by imitating the natural hormone 17B-estradiol. In the past BPA has been considered a weak mimicker of estrogen but newer evidence indicates that it is a potent mimicker. When it binds to estrogen receptors it triggers alternative estrogenic effects that begin outside of the nucleus. This different path induced by BPA has been shown to alter glucose and lipid metabolism in animal studies.

There are different effects of BPA exposure during different stages of development. During adulthood, BPA exposure modifies insulin sensitivity and insulin release without affecting weight.

==== Thyroid function ====
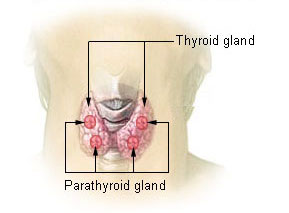
BPA is a thyroid-disrupting chemical, that may especially affect pregnant women, neonates and small children.

A 2007 review concluded that bisphenol-A has been shown to bind to thyroid hormone receptor and perhaps has selective effects on its functions.

A 2009 review about environmental chemicals and thyroid function raised concerns about BPA effects on triiodothyronine and concluded that "available evidence suggests that governing agencies need to regulate the use of thyroid-disrupting chemicals, particularly as such uses relate exposures of pregnant women, neonates and small children to the agents".

A 2009 review summarized BPA adverse effects on thyroid hormone action.

A 2016 case control study found that there was a significant association between urinary BPA levels and increased TSH levels (Thyroid- stimulating hormone) in a group of adult women.

=== Neurological effects ===
Limited epidemiological evidence suggests that exposure to BPA in the uterus and during childhood is associated with poor behavioral outcomes in humans. Exposure may be associated with higher levels of anxiety, depression, hyperactivity, and aggression in children. A panel convened by the National Toxicology Program (NTP) of the U.S. National Institutes of Health determined that there was "some concern" about BPA's effects on fetal and infant brain development and behavior. In January 2010, based on the NTP report, the FDA expressed the same level of concern.

A 2007 literature review concluded that BPA, like other chemicals that mimic estrogen (xenoestrogens), should be considered as a player within the nervous system that can regulate or alter its functions through multiple pathways. A 2008 review of animal research found that low-dose BPA maternal exposure can cause long-term consequences for the neurobehavioral development in mice.

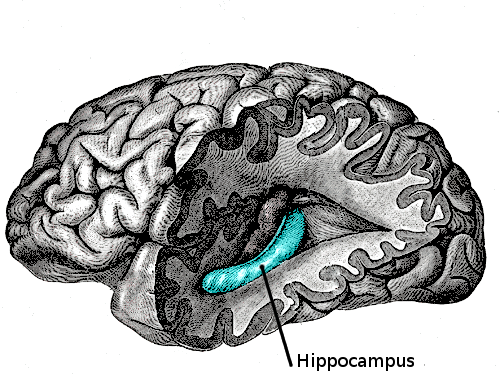
A 2008 review of studies concluded that BPA altered long-term potentiation in the hippocampus and even nanomolar (10^{−9} mol) dosage could induce significant effects on memory processes.

A 2009 review raised concerns about a BPA effect on the anteroventral periventricular nucleus.

==== Disruption of the dopaminergic system ====
A 2008 review concluded that BPA mimics estrogenic activity and affects various dopaminergic processes to enhance mesolimbic dopamine activity resulting in hyperactivity, attention deficits, and a heightened sensitivity to drugs of abuse.

A 2008 review of human participants has concluded that BPA mimics estrogenic activity and affects various dopaminergic processes to enhance mesolimbic dopamine activity resulting in hyperactivity, attention deficits, and a heightened sensitivity to drugs of abuse.

=== Cancer ===
According to the WHO's INFOSAN, carcinogenicity studies conducted under the U.S. National Toxicology Program have shown increases in leukemia and testicular interstitial cell tumors in male rats. However, according to the note, "these studies have not been considered as convincing evidence of a potential cancer risk because of the doubtful statistical significance of the small differences in incidences from controls."

A 2010 review concluded that bisphenol A may increase cancer risk. Several studies show evidence that the formation of prostate cancer in men is directly proportional to BPA exposure. Male subject diagnosed with prostate cancer were found to have higher urine concentration of BPA as opposed to the concentrations found in the control group's. This correlation may be due to BPA's ability to induce cell proliferation of the prostate cancer cells.

==== Breast cancer ====
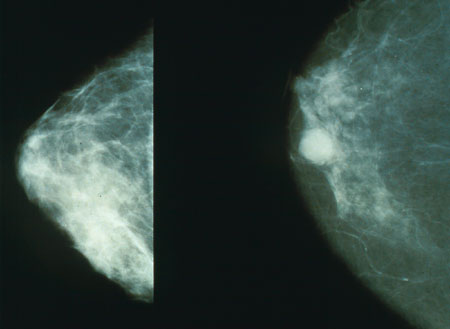
Evidence from animal models is accumulating that perinatal exposure to BPA alters breast development and increases breast cancer risk.

Higher susceptibility to breast cancer has been found in many studies of rodents and primates exposed to BPA. However, it is the impact BPA has on breast cancer development in humans is unclear, as it is difficult to quantify an individual's BPA exposure over their lifetime. BPA, which includes a phenolic structure, has shown an association with agonist and antagonistic endocrine receptors that facilitate endocrine disorders such as breast and prostate cancer. Other endocrine disorders include infertility, polycystic ovary syndrome, and precocious puberty.

More oxidative stress in breast cancer cells were found to be directly proportional to BPA exposure as per the findings in several in vitro studies. Additionally, work related exposure to BPA, and women who are postmenopausal have suggested an increase in breast cancer incidence.

===== Mechanism of action =====
BPA is an endocrine disruptor, meaning BPA has a similar structure to oestrogen (ligand) and can bind to the oestrogen receptor ERα and ERβ and activate it.

Oestrogen is hydrophobic and is able to diffuse through the plasma membrane and into the target cell. Oestradiol binding to the oestrogen receptor releases the heat shock protein from the ligand binding domain of the receptor causing dimerization. The nuclear localisation signal targets the ligand-receptor complex to the nucleus where it can bind oestrogen response elements within the promoter of target genes on DNA. Subsequently, various cofactors are recruited allowing transcription of genes including those involved in cell proliferation.

When BPA is exposed to high temperatures or changes in pH, the ester bond linking BPA monomers is hydrolysed. Free BPA then competes with oestrogen for ERα and ERβ binding sites. When BPA successfully binds the receptor, it interacts with ERE and increases expression of target genes like WNT-4 and RANKL; two key players in stem cell proliferation and carcinogenesis. BPA was also shown to inactivate p53 which prevents tumour formation as it triggers apoptosis.

=== Fertility ===
As of 2022, current evidence shows a possible positive correlation between BPA levels, lower sperm quality, decreased motility and an increase in sperm immaturity. There is tentative evidence to support the idea that BPA exposure has negative effects on human fertility. Few studies have investigated whether recurrent miscarriage is associated with BPA levels. Exposure to BPA does not appear to be linked with higher rates of endometrial hyperplasia. A 2009 cohort study linked urinary BPA concentration of women undergoing IVF egg retrieval, with an inverse correlation to oocyte release. The study found that for each unit increase in day 3 FSH (IU/L), there was an average decrease of 9% in the number of oocytes retrieved. The positive correlations found in animal studies warrants the continued research of BPA for couple fecundity.

Ubiquitous in environment through consumer products such as reusable plastics, food and beverage container liners, baby bottles, water resistant clothing. It has been identified as an EDC and found in urine, blood, amniotic fluid, breast milk and cord blood. Comparing blood BPA and phthalate levels between fertile and infertile women between the ages of 20–40, using gas chromatographic-mass spectrometry to analyze the amount of BPA, phthalate and their metabolites in peripheral venous blood, showed significantly elevated serum BPA level in infertile women, as well as women with PCOS (polycystic ovarian syndrome) and women with endometriosis

BPA is shown to have transgenerational effect by targeting ovarian function by changes in the structural integrity of microtubules that constitute meiotic spindles. BPA contaminants pass through amniotic fluid can alter steroidogenesis in fetal development. This will result if oocyte maturation failure as well as fertility This in turn will result in transgenerational effect and affect the third generation of offspring

==== Sexual function ====
Higher BPA exposure has been associated with increased self-reporting of decreased male sexual function, but few studies examining this relationship have been conducted.

=== Asthma ===
Studies in mice have found a link between BPA exposure and asthma; a 2010 study on mice has concluded that perinatal exposure to 10 μg/mL of BPA in drinking water enhances allergic sensitization and bronchial inflammation and responsiveness in an animal model of asthma. A study published in JAMA Pediatrics has found that prenatal exposure to BPA is also linked to lower lung capacity in some young children. This study had 398 mother-infant pairs and looked at their urine samples to detect concentrations of BPA. They study found that every 10-fold increase in BPA was tied to a 55% increase in the odds of wheezing. The higher the concentration of BPA during pregnancy were linked to decrease lung capacity in children under four years old but the link disappeared at age 5. Associate professor of pediatrics at the University of Maryland School of Medicine said, "Exposure during pregnancy, not after, appears to be the critical time for BPA, possibly because it's affecting important pathways that help the lung develop."

In 2013, research from scientists at the Columbia Center for Children's Environmental Health also found a link between the compound and an increased risk for asthma. The research team reported that children with higher levels of BPA at ages 3, 5 and 7 had increased odds of developing asthma when they were between the ages of 5 and 12. The children in this study had about the same concentration of BPA exposure as the average U.S. child. Dr. Kathleen Donohue, an instructor at Columbia University Medical Center said, "they saw an increased risk of asthma at fairly routine, low doses of BPA." Kim Harley, who studies environmental chemicals and children's health, commented in the Scientific American journal saying while the study does not show that BPA causes asthma or wheezing, "it's an important study because we don't know a lot right now about how BPA affects immune response and asthma...They measured BPA at different ages, measured asthma and wheeze at multiple points, and still found consistent associations."

=== Animal research ===
The first evidence of the estrogenicity of bisphenol A came from experiments on rats conducted in the 1930s, but it was not until 1997 that adverse effects of low-dose exposure on laboratory animals were first reported. Bisphenol A is an endocrine disruptor that can mimic estrogen and has been shown to cause negative health effects in animal studies. Bisphenol A closely mimics the structure and function of the hormone estradiol by binding to and activating the same estrogen receptor as the natural hormone. Early developmental stages appear to be the period of greatest sensitivity to its effects,

A study from 2008 concluded that blood levels of bisphenol A in neonatal mice are the same whether it is injected or ingested. The current U.S. human exposure limit set by the EPA is 50 μg/kg/day. In a 2010 commentary a group of scientists criticized a study designed to test low dose BPA exposure published in "Toxicological Sciences" and a later editorial by the same journal, which claimed the rats used in the study were insensitive to estrogen and that had other problems like the use of BPA-containing polycabonate cages while the authors disagreed.

Different expression of ERR-γ in different parts of the body may account for variations in bisphenol A effects. For instance, ERR-γ has been found in high concentration in the placenta, explaining reports of high bisphenol accumulation in this tissue.

=== Environmental effects ===
In 2010, the U.S. Environmental Protection Agency reported that over one million pounds of BPA are released into the environment annually. BPA can be released into the environment by both pre-consumer and post-consumer leaching. Common routes of introduction from the pre-consumer perspective into the environment are directly from chemical plastics, coat and staining manufacturers, foundries who use BPA in casting sand, or transport of BPA and BPA-containing products . Post-consumer BPA waste comes from effluent discharge from municipal wastewater treatment plants, irrigation pipes used in agriculture, ocean-borne plastic trash, indirect leaching from plastic, paper, and metal waste in landfills, and paper or material recycling companies. Despite a rapid soil and water half-life of 4.5 days, and an air half-life of less than one day, BPA's ubiquity makes it an important pollutant. BPA has a low rate of evaporation from water and soil, which presents issues, despite its biodegradability and low concern for bio-accumulation. BPA has low volatility in the atmosphere and a low vapor pressure between 5.00 and 5.32 Pascals. BPA has a high water solubility of about 120 mg/L and most of its reactions in the environment are aqueous. An interesting fact is that BPA dust is flammable if ignited, but it has a minimal explosive concentration in air. Also, in aqueous solutions, BPA has shown absorption of wavelengths greater than 250 nm.

The ubiquitous nature of BPA makes the compound an important pollutant to study as it has been shown to interfere with nitrogen fixation at the roots of leguminous plants associated with the bacterial symbiont Sinorhizobium meliloti. A 2013 study also observed changes in plant health due to BPA exposure. The study exposed soybean seedlings to various concentrations of BPA and saw changes in root growth, nitrate production, ammonium production, and changes in the activities of nitrate reductase and nitrite reductase. At low doses of BPA, the growth of roots were improved, the amount of nitrate in roots increased, the amount of ammonium in roots decreased, and the nitrate and nitrite reductase activities remained unchanged. However, at considerably higher concentrations of BPA, the opposite effects were seen for all but an increase in nitrate concentration and a decrease in nitrite and nitrate reductase activities. Nitrogen is both a plant nutritional substance, but also the basis of growth and development in plants. Changing concentrations of BPA can be harmful to the ecology of an ecosystem, as well as to humans if the plants are produced to be consumed.

The amount of absorbed BPA on sediment was also seen to decrease with increases in temperature, as demonstrated by a study in 2006 with various plants from the XiangJiang River in Central-South China. In general, as temperature increases, the water solubility of a compound increases. Therefore, the amount of sorbate that enters the solid phase will lower at the equilibrium point. It was also observed that the adsorption process of BPA on sediment is exothermic, the molar formation enthalpy, ΔH°, was negative, the free energy ΔG°, was negative, and the molar entropy, ΔS°, was positive. This indicates that the adsorption of BPA is driven by enthalpy. The adsorption of BPA has also been observed to decrease with increasing pH.

A 2005 study conducted in the United States had found that 91–98% of BPA may be removed from water during treatment at municipal water treatment plants. A more detailed explanation of aqueous reactions of BPA can be observed in the Degradation of BPA section below. Nevertheless, a 2009 meta-analysis of BPA in the surface water system showed BPA present in surface water and sediment in the United States and Europe. According to Environment Canada in 2011, "BPA can currently be found in municipal wastewater. […]initial assessment shows that at low levels, bisphenol A can harm fish and organisms over time."

BPA affects growth, reproduction, and development in aquatic organisms. Among freshwater organisms, fish appear to be the most sensitive species. Evidence of endocrine-related effects in fish, aquatic invertebrates, amphibians, and reptiles has been reported at environmentally relevant exposure levels lower than those required for acute toxicity. There is a widespread variation in reported values for endocrine-related effects, but many fall in the range of 1μg/L to 1 mg/L.

A 2009 review of the biological impacts of plasticizers on wildlife published by the Royal Society with a focus on aquatic and terrestrial annelids, molluscs, crustaceans, insects, fish and amphibians concluded that BPA affects reproduction in all studied animal groups, impairs development in crustaceans and amphibians and induces genetic aberrations.

== Vertebrates ==
BPA is known as an endocrine disruptor compound (EDC) and has major neurological effects on vertebrates. Depending on the vertebrate species studied, the documented effects of ingestion and exposure to BPA may differ. In species such as Zebrafish, BPA affects the lateral line which is crucial for sensory perception and may affect the expression of genes that are controlling heart and skeletal muscle metabolism, as well as insulin secretion control. Aquatic vertebrates are especially impacted by BPA in reproduction. In the broad- snouted caiman, Caiman latirostris, gender is normally determined by the temperature at which the egg is incubated at. A study was conducted where their eggs were exposed to BPA. The first set was exposed at about 1000 μg/egg and all of the offspring were female. When the eggs were exposed at a lower concentration at about 90 μg/egg, the offspring produced were males. These male offspring exhibited disrupted seminiferous tubules. In mice, maternal diet has been studied and found to have a major effect on the offspring that were exposed to BPA during certain developmental stages. There are no direct studies on humans, however, studies on the vertebrates suggest the potential harm it may have.

=== Reproductive effects ===
Bisphenol A (BPA) is an environmental contaminant that disrupts the ecosystem, with the most profound effects observed in vertebrates. BPA infiltrates the environment by running off of landfills so because of this, it is mostly found in water. Aquatic vertebrates are thus the most affected by this form of pollution. After the aquatic vertebrates inhale BPA through their gills or skin, they are mainly affected by BPA at the cellular level, affecting their estrogen levels. BPA binds to the estrogen receptors and has an antagonist effect, which means that it decreases the amount of estrogen produced. To regulate reproductive functions, Gonadotropin releasing hormone (GnRH) is released. This helps with maturation of the sex organs in both males and females. Another study found that Barbus sp., immature barbels, in a river with traces of BPA expressed intersex characteristics. They had gonads with oogonia, spermatogonia and spermatocytes. Researchers concluded that BPA did not induce but did contribute to these intersex morphological expressions. After being exposed to 1μg/L BPA, Salmo trutta, brown trout, had reduced sperm density and mobility. In Pimephales promelas, fathead minnows, there was a reduction of sperm production. Both species were also exposed to 2 μg/L and 5 μg/L of BPA and it resulted in delayed ovulation or no ovulation for the fish.

A study was conducted using adult female Gobiocypris rarus, a rare minnow. The fish were exposed to 5 μg/L, 15μg/L and 50 μg/L of BPA for 14 days and 35 days. The results showed the group exposed to the highest amount of BPA (50 μg/L) for 35 days showed suppressed effects on oocyte development. It also showed that all groups had a stimulatory effect on the hepatic vitellogenin transcription (VTG). VTG is an indicator that the vertebrate has become exposed to environmental estrogens. The groups exposed to a lower concentration of BPA (5 μg/L & 15μg/L) showed an increase in expressed ovarian steroidogenic genes. Meanwhile, the group exposed to a higher concentration of BPA (50 μg/L) showed a decrease in expressed ovarian steroidogenic genes.

Although aquatic vertebrates are most commonly affected by BPA exposure in natural settings, researchers often learn how BPA effects other vertebrates using experimental mice models. In a study conducted twenty years ago, there was an accidental BPA exposure. This resulted in an increase in chromosomally abnormal eggs. This led researchers to question what other effects this has on mammals. It showed that BPA leads to meiotic changes such as fertility and maturation of sex organs. Scientists started to realize that this type of exposure could lead to mutations and affect multiple generations. Because of this, "BPA free" products started to be made but to do this, BPS was being used. A study was conducted showing that exposure to BPS increased mutations before zygotic development showing that it is just as dangerous as BPA.

=== Behavioral effects ===
BPA has major effects on the behavior of vertebrates, especially in their sensory processing systems. In zebrafish BPA can disrupt the signaling in the endocrine system and affect auditory development and function. Similar to a human ear, the zebrafish have a sensory organ called the lateral line that detects different forms of vibration. The hair cells within the lateral line are very sensitive to the toxic effects of BPA and are most commonly killed from BPA; fish are able to regrow hair cells but BPA has decreased their ability to reproduce them as efficiently. Fish without a fully functioning lateral line have behavioral changes such as: higher risk of predation, lowered prey detection and possible reproduction abilities. Unlike fish, mammals have a threat to go deaf if exposed directly.

As well as an endocrine disruptor compound (EDC), BPA has been found to inhibit nerve conduction. In the sciatic nerve of a frog (Rana tigrina), BPA inhibits the fast-conducting compound action potential (CAP). Estrogen receptors found in the plasma membrane of the sciatic nerve are affected by the BPA and inhibit CAP. However, estrogen receptors are not the only reason for inhibition, BPA is able to inhibit nerve functions without affecting estrogen.

A study in mice shows that BPA as an EDC acts as an agonist/antagonist for behavioral effects. BPA caused a decrease in exploratory and spatial behaviors in male mice who were exposed in the developmental state. In order to expose the males, pregnant females were fed with BPA in food the mice were compared to males whose mothers were fed with a phytoestrogen-free CTL diet. Males with the BPA exposure in developmental stages were less likely to be territorial when the other male mice were present. BPA exposure changed the behavior of sex and species-dependent behavior. These conclusions are suggestions to support the idea that BPA can cause sexually selected traits. Furthermore, maternal diet and exposing the developmental mice to BPA, may cause harm and lead to sexually dimorphic responses.

== Positions of national and international bodies ==
=== World Health Organization ===
In November 2009, the WHO announced to organize an expert consultation in 2010 to assess low-dose BPA exposure health effects, focusing on the nervous and behavioral system and exposure to young children. The 2010 WHO expert panel recommended no new regulations limiting or banning the use of bisphenol-A, stating that "initiation of public health measures would be premature."

=== United States ===
In 2013, the FDA posted on its web site: "Is BPA safe? Yes. Based on FDA's ongoing safety review of scientific evidence, the available information continues to support the safety of BPA for the approved uses in food containers and packaging. People are exposed to low levels of BPA because, like many packaging components, very small amounts of BPA may migrate from the food packaging into foods or beverages." FDA issued a statement on the basis of three previous reviews by a group of assembled Agency experts in 2014 in its "Final report for the review of literature and data on BPA" that said in part, "The results of these new toxicity data and studies do not affect the dose-effect level and the existing NOAEL (5 mg/kg bw/day; oral exposure)."

=== Australia and New Zealand ===
In 2009 the Australia and New Zealand Food Safety Authority (Food Standards Australia New Zealand) did not see any health risk with bisphenol A baby bottles if the manufacturer's instructions were followed, as levels of exposure were very low and would not pose a significant health risk. It added that "the move by overseas manufacturers to stop using BPA in baby bottles is a voluntary action and not the result of a specific action by regulators." In 2008 it had suggested the use of glass baby bottles if parents had concerns.

In 2012 the Australian Government introduced a voluntary phase out of BPA use in polycarbonate baby bottles.

=== Canada ===
In April 2008, Health Canada concluded that, while adverse health effects were not expected, the margin of safety was too small for formula-fed infants and proposed classifying the chemical as "'toxic' to human health and the environment." The Canadian Minister of Health announced Canada's intent to ban the import, sale, and advertisement of polycarbonate baby bottles containing bisphenol A due to safety concerns, and investigate ways to reduce BPA contamination of baby formula packaged in metal cans. Subsequent news reports from April 2008 showed many retailers removing polycarbonate drinking products from their shelves. On 18 October 2008, Health Canada noted that "bisphenol A exposure to newborns and infants is below levels that cause effects" and that the "general public need not be concerned".

In 2010, Canada's department of the environment declared BPA to be a "toxic substance" and added it to schedule 1 of the Canadian Environmental Protection Act, 1999.

=== European Union ===
The 2008 European Union Risk Assessment Report on bisphenol A, published by the European Commission and European Food Safety Authority (EFSA), concluded that bisphenol A-based products, such as polycarbonate plastic and epoxy resins, are safe for consumers and the environment when used as intended. By October 2008, after the Lang Study was published, the EFSA issued a statement concluding that the study provided no grounds to revise the current Tolerable Daily Intake (TDI) level for BPA of 0.05 mg/kg bodyweight.

On 22 December 2009, the EU Environment ministers released a statement expressing concerns over recent studies showing adverse effects of exposure to endocrine disruptors.

In September 2010, the European Food Safety Authority (EFSA) concluded after a "comprehensive evaluation of recent toxicity data […] that no new study could be identified, which would call for a revision of the current TDI". The Panel noted that some studies conducted on developing animals have suggested BPA-related effects of possible toxicological relevance, in particular biochemical changes in brain, immune-modulatory effects and enhanced susceptibility to breast tumours but considered that those studies had several shortcomings so the relevance of these findings for human health could not be assessed.

On 25 November 2010, the European Union executive commission said it planned to ban the manufacturing by 1 March 2011 and ban the marketing and market placement of polycarbonate baby bottles containing the organic compound bisphenol A by 1 June 2011, according to John Dalli, commissioner in charge of health and consumer policy. This was backed by a majority of EU governments. The ban was called an over-reaction by Richard Sharpe, of the Medical Research Council's Human Reproductive Sciences Unit, who said to be unaware of any convincing evidence justifying the measure and criticized it as being done on political, rather than scientific grounds.

In January 2011 use of bisphenol A in baby bottles was forbidden in all EU-countries.

After reviewing more recent research, in 2012 EFSA made a decision to re-evaluate the human risks associated with exposure to BPA. They completed a draft assessment of consumer exposure to BPA in July 2013 and at that time asked for public input from all stakeholders to assist in forming a final report, which is expected to be completed in 2014.

In January 2014, EFSA presented a second part of the draft opinion which discussed the human health risks posed by BPA. The draft opinion was accompanied by an eight-week public consultation and also included adverse effects on the liver and kidney as related to BPA. From this it was recommended that the current TDI to be revised. In January 2015 EFSA indicated that the TDI was reduced from 50 to 4 μg/kg body weight/day – a recommendation, as national legislatures make the laws.

The EU Commission issued a new regulation regarding the use of bisphenol A in thermal paper on 12 December 2016. According to this new regulation, thermal paper containing bisphenol A cannot be placed on the EU market after 2 January 2020. This regulation came into effect on 2 January 2017 but there is a transition period of three years.

On 12 January 2017, BPA was added to the candidate list of substances of very high concern (SVHC). Candidate SVHC listing is a first step towards restricting the importing and use of a chemical in the EU. If the European Chemical Agency assigns SVHC status, the presence of BPA in a product at a concentration above 0.1% must be disclosed to a purchaser (with different rules for consumer and business purchasers). In February 2016, France had announced that it intended to propose BPA as a candidate SVHC by 8 August 2016.

On 20 January 2025, BPA was banned from usage in food contain material after a 2023 EFSA report concluded that BPA exposure constitutes a risk to all age groups.

==== Denmark ====
In May 2009, the Danish parliament passed a resolution to ban the use of BPA in baby bottles, which had not been enacted by April 2010. In March 2010, a temporary ban was declared by the Health Minister.

==== Belgium ====
In March 2010, senator Philippe Mahoux proposed legislation to ban BPA in food contact plastics. In May 2011, senators Dominique Tilmans and Jacques Brotchi proposed legislation to ban BPA from thermal paper.

==== France ====
On 5 February 2010, the French Food Safety Agency (AFSSA) questioned the previous assessments of the health risks of BPA, especially in regard to behavioral effects observed in rat pups following exposure in utero and during the first months of life. In April 2010, the AFFSA suggested the adoption of better labels for food products containing BPA.

On 24 March 2010, the French Senate unanimously approved a proposition of law to ban BPA from baby bottles. The National Assembly (Lower House) approved the text on 23 June 2010, which has been applicable law since 2 July 2010. On 12 October 2011, the French National Assembly voted a law forbidding the use of Bisphenol A in products aimed at less than 3-year-old children for 2013, and 2014 for all food containers.

On 9 October 2012, the French Senate adopted unanimously the law proposition to suspend manufacture, import, export and marketing of all food containers that include bisphenol A for 2015. The ban of bisphenol A in 2013 for food products designed for children less than 3-years-old was maintained.

==== Germany ====
On 19 September 2008, the German Federal Institute for Risk Assessment (Bundesinstitut für Risikobewertung, BfR) stated that there was no reason to change the current risk assessment for bisphenol A on the basis of the Lang Study.

In October 2009, the German environmental organization Bund für Umwelt und Naturschutz Deutschland requested a ban on BPA for children's products, especially pacifiers, and products that make contact with food. In response, some manufacturers voluntarily removed the problematic pacifiers from the market.

==== Netherlands ====
On 3 March 2016, the Netherlands Food and Consumer Product Safety Authority (NVWA) issued cautionary recommendations to the Minister of Health, Welfare, and Sport and the Secretary for Economic Affairs, on the public intake of BPA, especially for vulnerable groups such as women who are pregnant or breastfeeding, and those with developing immune systems such as children below the age of 10. This was done in response to recent published research, and conclusions reached by the European Food Safety Authority. It also called for the concentration of BPA in drinking water to be lowered below 0.2 μg/L, in line with the maximum tolerable intake they recommend.

==== Switzerland ====
In February 2009, the Swiss Federal Office for Public Health, based on reports of other health agencies, stated that the intake of bisphenol A from food represents no risk to the consumer, including newborns and infants. However, in the same statement, it advised for proper use of polycarbonate baby bottles and listed alternatives.

==== Sweden ====
By 26 May 1995, the Swedish Chemicals Agency asked for a BPA ban in baby bottles, but the Swedish Food Safety Authority prefers to await the expected European Food Safety Authority's updated review. The Minister of Environment said to wait for the EFSA review but not for too long. From March 2011 it is prohibited to manufacture babybottles containing bisphenol A and from July 2011 they can not be bought in stores. On 12 April 2012, the Swedish government announced that Sweden will ban BPA in cans containing food for children under the age of three.

Since January 2, 2020, BPA has been banned in thermal receipts as a consequence of the EU wide ban.

Since September 1, 2016, it is prohibited to use BPA when relining water pipes with CIPP.

==== United Kingdom ====
In December 2009, responding to a letter from a group of seven scientists that urged the UK Government to "adopt a standpoint consistent with the approach taken by other Governments who have ended the use of BPA in food contact products marketed at children", the UK Food Standards Agency reaffirmed, in January 2009, its view that "exposure of UK consumers to BPA from all sources, including food contact materials, was well below levels considered harmful".

==== Turkey ====
As of 10 June 2011, Turkey banned the use of BPA in baby bottles and other PC items produced for babies.

=== Japan ===
Between 1998 and 2003, the canning industry voluntarily replaced its BPA-containing epoxy resin can liners with BPA-free polyethylene terephthalate (PET) in many of its products. For other products, it switched to a different epoxy lining that yielded much less migration of BPA into food than the previously used resin. In addition, polycarbonate tableware for school lunches was replaced by BPA-free plastics.

== Human exposure sources ==
The major human exposure route to BPA is diet, including ingestion of contaminated food and water.

It is especially likely to leach from plastics when they are cleaned with harsh detergents or when they contain acidic or high-temperature liquids. BPA is used to form epoxy resin coating of water pipes; in older buildings, such resin coatings are used to avoid replacement of deteriorating pipes. In the workplace, while handling and manufacturing products which contain BPA, inhalation and dermal exposures are the most probable routes. There are many uses of BPA for which related potential exposures have not been fully assessed including digital media, electrical and electronic equipment, automobiles, sports safety equipment, electrical laminates for printed circuit boards, composites, paints, and adhesives. In addition to being present in many products that people use on a daily basis, BPA has the ability to bioaccumulate, especially in water bodies. In one review, it was seen that although BPA is biodegradable, it is still detected after wastewater treatment in many waterways at concentrations of approximately 1 ug/L. This study also looked at other pathways where BPA could potentially bioaccumulate and found "low-moderate potential...in microorganisms, algae, invertebrates, and fish in the environment" suggesting that some environmental exposures are less likely.

In November 2009, the Consumer Reports magazine published an analysis of BPA content in some canned foods and beverages, where in specific cases the content of a single can of food could exceed the FDA "Cumulative Exposure Daily Intake" limit.

The CDC had found bisphenol A in the urine of 95% of adults sampled in 1988–1994 and in 93% of children and adults tested in 2003–04. The USEPA Reference dose (RfD) for BPA is 50 μg/kg/day which is not enforceable but is the recommended safe level of exposure. The most sensitive animal studies show effects at much lower doses, and several studies of children, who tend to have the highest levels, have found levels over the EPA's suggested safe limit figure.

A 2009 Health Canada study found that the majority of canned soft drinks it tested had low, but measurable levels of bisphenol A. A study conducted by the University of Texas School of Public Health in 2010 found BPA in 63 of 105 samples of fresh and canned foods, including fresh turkey sold in plastic packaging and canned infant formula. A 2011 study published in Environmental Health Perspectives, "Food Packaging and Bisphenol A and Bis(2-Ethyhexyl) Phthalate Exposure: Findings from a Dietary Intervention," selected 20 participants based on their self-reported use of canned and packaged foods to study BPA. Participants ate their usual diets, followed by three days of consuming foods that were not canned or packaged. The study's findings include: 1) evidence of BPA in participants' urine decreased by 50% to 70% during the period of eating fresh foods; and 2) participants' reports of their food practices suggested that consumption of canned foods and beverages and restaurant meals were the most likely sources of exposure to BPA in their usual diets. The researchers note that, even beyond these 20 participants, BPA exposure is widespread, with detectable levels in urine samples in more than an estimated 90% of the U.S. population. Another U.S. study found that consumption of soda, school lunches, and meals prepared outside the home were statistically significantly associated with higher urinary BPA.

A 2011 experiment by researchers at the Harvard School of Public Health indicated that BPA used in the lining of food cans is absorbed by the food and then ingested by consumers. Of 75 participants, half ate a lunch of canned vegetable soup for five days, followed by five days of fresh soup, while the other half did the same experiment in reverse order. "The analysis revealed that when participants ate the canned soup, they experienced more than a 1,000 percent increase in their urinary concentrations of BPA, compared to when they dined on fresh soup." A 2009 study found that drinking from polycarbonate bottles increased urinary bisphenol A levels by two-thirds, from 1.2 μg/g creatinine to 2 μg/g creatinine. Consumer groups recommend that people wishing to lower their exposure to bisphenol A avoid canned food and polycarbonate plastic containers (which shares resin identification code 7 with many other plastics) unless the packaging indicates the plastic is bisphenol A-free. To avoid the possibility of BPA leaching into food or drink, the National Toxicology Panel recommends avoiding microwaving food in plastic containers, putting plastics in the dishwasher, or using harsh detergents.

Besides diet, exposure can also occur through air and through skin absorption. Free BPA is found in high concentration in thermal paper and carbonless copy paper, which would be expected to be more available for exposure than BPA bound into resin or plastic. Popular uses of thermal paper include receipts, event and cinema tickets, labels, and airline tickets. A Swiss study found that 11 of 13 thermal printing papers contained 8 – 17 g/kg bisphenol A (BPA). Upon dry finger contact with a thermal paper receipt, roughly 1 μg BPA (0.2 – 6 μg) was transferred to the forefinger and the middle finger. For wet or greasy fingers approximately 10 times more was transferred. Extraction of BPA from the fingers was possible up to 2 hours after exposure. Further, it has been demonstrated that thermal receipts placed in contact with paper currency in a wallet for 24 hours cause a dramatic increase in the concentration of BPA in paper currency, making paper money a secondary source of exposure. Another study has identified BPA in all of the waste paper samples analysed (newspapers, magazines, office paper, etc.), indicating direct results of contamination through paper recycling. Free BPA can readily be transferred to skin, and residues on hands can be ingested. Bodily intake through dermal absorption (99% of which comes from handling receipts) has been shown for the general population to be 0.219 ng/kg bw/day (occupationally exposed persons absorb higher amounts at 16.3 ng/kg bw/day) whereas aggregate intake (food/beverage/environment) for adults is estimated at 0.36–0.43 μg/kg bw/day (estimated intake for occupationally exposed adults is 0.043–100 μg/kg bw/day).

A study from 2011 found that Americans of all age groups had twice as much BPA in their bodies as Canadians; the reasons for the disparity were unknown, as there was no evidence to suggest higher amounts of BPA in U.S. foods, or that consumer products available in the U.S. containing BPA were BPA-free in Canada. According to another study it may have been due to differences in how and when the surveys were done, because "although comparisons of measured concentrations can be made across populations, this must be done with caution owing to differences in sampling, in the analytical methods used and in the sensitivity of the assays."

Comparing data from the National Health and Nutrition Examination Surveys (NHANES) from four time periods between 2003 and 2012, urinary BPA data the median daily intake for the overall population is approximately 25 ng/kg/day and below current health based guidelines. Additionally, daily intake of BPA in the United States has decreased significantly compared to the intakes measured in 2003–2004. Public attention and governmental action during this time period may have decreased the exposure to BPA somewhat but these studies did not include children under the age of six. According to the Endocrine Society, age of exposure is an important factor in determining the extent to which endocrine disrupting chemicals will have an effect, and the effects on developing fetuses or infants is quite different than an adult.

=== Fetal and early-childhood exposures ===
A 2009 study found higher urinary concentrations in young children than in adults under typical exposure scenarios. In adults, BPA is eliminated from the body through a detoxification process in the liver. In infants and children, this pathway is not fully developed so they have a decreased ability to clear BPA from their systems. Several recent studies of children have found levels that exceed the EPAs suggested safe limit figure.

Infants fed with liquid formula are among the most exposed, and those fed formula from polycarbonate bottles can consume up to 13 micrograms of bisphenol A per kg of body weight per day (μg/kg/day; see table below). In the U.S. and Canada, BPA has been found in infant liquid formula in concentrations varying from 0.48 to 11 ng/g. BPA has been rarely found in infant powder formula (only 1 of 14). The U.S. Department of Health & Human Services (HHS) states that "the benefit of a stable source of good nutrition from infant formula and food outweighs the potential risk of BPA exposure". BPA is present in human breast milk, having been found by several studies in 62–75% of breast milk samples. This is presumably due to the mothers being exposed to BPA since it is not naturally produced by the body.

Children may be more susceptible to BPA exposure than adults (see health effects). A 2010 study of people in Austria, Switzerland, and Germany has suggested polycarbonate (PC) baby bottles as the most prominent role of exposure for infants, and canned food for adults and teenagers. In the United States, the growing concern over BPA exposure in infants in recent years has led the manufacturers of plastic baby bottles to stop using BPA in their bottles. The FDA banned the use of BPA in baby bottles and sippy cups (July 2012) as well as the use of epoxy resins in infant formula packaging. However, babies may still be exposed if they are fed with old or hand-me-down bottles bought before the companies stopped using BPA.

One often overlooked source of exposure occurs when a pregnant woman is exposed, thereby exposing the fetus. Animal studies have shown that BPA can be found in both the placenta and the amniotic fluid of pregnant mice. Since BPA was also "detected in the urine and serum of pregnant women and the serum, plasma, and placenta of newborn infants" a study to examine the externalizing behaviors associated with prenatal exposure to BPA was performed which suggests that exposures earlier in development have more of an effect on the behavior outcomes and that female children (2-years-old) are impacted more than males. A study of 244 mothers indicated that exposure to BPA before birth could affect the behavior of girls at age 3. Girls whose mother's urine contained high levels of BPA during pregnancy scored worse on tests of anxiety and hyperactivity. Although these girls still scored within a normal range, for every 10-fold increase in the BPA of the mother, the girls scored at least six points lower on the tests. Boys did not seem to be affected by their mother's BPA levels during pregnancy. After the baby is born, maternal exposure can continue to affect the infant through transfer of BPA to the infant via breast milk. Because of these exposures that can occur both during and after pregnancy, mothers wishing to limit their child's exposure to BPA should attempt to limit their own exposures during that time period.

While the majority of exposures have been shown to come through the diet, accidental ingestion can also be considered a source of exposure. One study conducted in Japan tested plastic baby books to look for possible leaching into saliva when babies chew on them. While the results of this study have yet to be replicated, it gives reason to question whether exposure can also occur in infants through ingestion by chewing on certain books or toys.

Population	Estimated daily bisphenol A intake (μg/kg body weight/day). Table adapted from the National Toxicology Program Expert Panel Report.
Infant (0–6 months) formula-fed (lower number assumes weight of 4.5 kg and intake of 700 ml/day with maximum concentration of BPA detected in U.S. canned formula; higher number assumes weight of 6.1 kg and intake of 1060 ml/day from powdered formula in cans with epoxy linings and using polycarbonate bottles)	1–11
Infant (0–6 months) breast-fed (lower number assumes weight of 6.1 kg and intake of 1060 ml/day with maximum concentration of BPA detected in Japanese breast milk samples; higher number assumes weight of 4.5 kg and intake of 700 ml/day with maximum concentration of free BPA detected in U.S. breast milk samples)	0.2–1
Infant (6–12 months)	1.65–13
Child (1.5–6 years)	0.043–14.7
Adult (general population)	0.008–1.5
Adult (occupational)	0.043–100

== Regulation ==
=== Public health regulatory history in the United States ===
Charles Schumer introduced a 'BPA-Free Kids Act of 2008' to the U.S. Senate seeking to ban BPA in any product designed for use by children and require the Centers for Disease Control to conduct a study about the health effects of BPA exposure. It was reintroduced in 2009 in both Senate and House, but died in committee each time.

In 2008, the FDA reassured consumers that current limits were safe, but convened an outside panel of experts to review the issue. The Lang study was released, and co-author David Melzer presented the results of the study before the FDA panel. An editorial accompanying the Lang study's publication criticized the FDA's assessment of bisphenol A: "A fundamental problem is that the current ADI [acceptable daily intake] for BPA is based on experiments conducted in the early 1980s using outdated methods (only very high doses were tested) and insensitive assays. More recent findings from independent scientists were rejected by the FDA, apparently because those investigators did not follow the outdated testing guidelines for environmental chemicals, whereas studies using the outdated, insensitive assays (predominantly involving studies funded by the chemical industry) are given more weight in arriving at the conclusion that BPA is not harmful at current exposure levels." The FDA was criticized that it was "basing its conclusion on two studies while downplaying the results of hundreds of other studies." Diana Zuckerman, president of the National Research Center for Women and Families, criticized the FDA in her testimony at the FDA's public meeting on the draft assessment of bisphenol A for use in food contact applications, that "At the very least, the FDA should require a prominent warning on products made with BPA".

In March 2009 Suffolk County, New York became the first county to pass legislation to ban baby beverage containers made with bisphenol A. By March 2009, legislation to ban bisphenol A had been proposed in both House and Senate. In the same month, Rochelle Tyl, author of two studies used by FDA to assert BPA safety in August 2008, said those studies did not claim that BPA is safe, because they were not designed to cover all aspects of the chemical's effects. In May 2009, Minnesota and Chicago were the first U.S. jurisdictions to pass regulations limiting or banning BPA. In June 2009, the FDA announced its decision to reconsider the BPA safety levels. Grassroots political action led Connecticut to become the first U.S. state to ban bisphenol A not only from infant formula and baby food containers, but also from any reusable food or beverage container. In July 2009, the California Environmental Protection Agency's Developmental and Reproductive Toxicity Identification Committee in the California Office of Environmental Health Hazard Assessment unanimously voted against placing Bisphenol A on the state's list of chemicals that are believed to cause reproductive harm. The panel was concerned over the growing scientific evidence showing BPA's reproductive harm in animals, found that there was insufficient data of the effects in humans. Critics pointed out that the same panel failed to add second-hand smoke to the list until 2006, and only one chemical was added to the list in the last three years. In September, the U.S. Environmental Protection Agency announced that it was evaluating BPA for an action plan development. In October, the NIH announced $30,000,000 in stimulus grants to study the health effects of BPA. This money was supposed to result in many peer-reviewed publications.

On 15 January 2010, the FDA expressed "some concern", the middle level in its scale of concerns, about the potential effects of BPA on the brain, behavior, and prostate gland in fetuses, infants, and young children, and announced that it was taking reasonable steps to reduce human exposure to BPA in the food supply. However, the FDA was not recommending that families change the use of infant formula or foods, as it saw the benefit of a stable source of good nutrition as outweighing the potential risk from BPA exposure. On the same date, the Department of Health and Human Services released information to help parents to reduce children's BPA exposure. As of 2010 many U.S. states were considering some sort of BPA ban.

In June 2010 the 2008–2009 Annual Report of the President's Cancer Panel was released and recommended: "Because of the long latency period of many cancers, the available evidence argues for a precautionary approach to these diverse chemicals, which include (…) bisphenol A". In August 2010, the Maine Board of Environmental Protection voted unanimously to ban the sale of baby bottles and other reusable food and beverage containers made with bisphenol A as of January 2012. In February 2011, the newly elected governor of Maine, Paul LePage, gained national attention when he spoke on a local TV news show saying he hoped to repeal the ban because, "There hasn't been any science that identifies that there is a problem" and added: "The only thing that I've heard is if you take a plastic bottle and put it in the microwave and you heat it up, it gives off a chemical similar to estrogen. So the worst case is some women may have little beards." In April 2011, the Maine legislature passed a bill to ban the use of BPA in baby bottles, sippy cups, and other reusable food and beverage containers, effective 1 January 2012. Governor LePage refused to sign the bill.

In October 2011, California banned BPA from baby bottles and toddlers' drinking cups, effective 1 July 2013. By 2011, 26 states had proposed legislation that would ban certain uses of BPA. Many bills died in committee. In July 2011, the American Medical Association (AMA) declared feeding products for babies and infants that contain BPA should be banned. It recommended better federal oversight of BPA and clear labeling of products containing it. It stressed the importance of the FDA to "actively incorporate current science into the regulation of food and beverage BPA-containing products."

In 2012, the FDA concluded an assessment of scientific research on the effects of BPA and stated in the March 2012 Consumer Update that "the scientific evidence at this time does not suggest that the very low levels of human exposure to BPA through the diet are unsafe" although recognizing "potential uncertainties in the overall interpretation of these studies including route of exposure used in the studies and the relevance of animal models to human health. The FDA is continuing to pursue additional research to resolve these uncertainties." Yet on 17 July 2012, the FDA banned BPA from baby bottles and sippy cups. A FDA spokesman said the agency's action was not based on safety concerns and that "the agency continues to support the safety of BPA for use in products that hold food." Since manufacturers had already stopped using the chemical in baby bottles and sippy cups, the decision was a response to a request by the American Chemistry Council, the chemical industry's main trade association, who believed that a ban would boost consumer confidence. The ban was criticized as "purely cosmetic" by the Environmental Working Group, which stated that "If the agency truly wants to prevent people from being exposed to this toxic chemical associated with a variety of serious and chronic conditions it should ban its use in cans of infant formula, food and beverages." The Natural Resources Defense Council called the move inadequate saying, the FDA needs to ban BPA from all food packaging.

As of 2014, 12 states have banned BPA from children's bottles and feeding containers.

=== Environmental regulation in the United States ===
On 30 December 2009 EPA released a so-called action plan for four chemicals, including BPA, which would have added it to the list of "chemicals of concern" regulated under the Toxic Substances Control Act. In February 2010, after lobbyists for the chemical industry had met with administration officials, the EPA delayed BPA regulation by not including the chemical.

On 29 March 2010, EPA published a revised action plan for BPA as "chemical of concern". In October 2010 an advanced Notice of Proposed Rulemaking for BPA testing was published in the Federal Register July 2011. After more than 3 years at the Office of Information and Regulatory Affairs (OIRA), part of the Office of Management and Budget (OMB), which has to review draft proposals within 3 months, OIRA had not done so.

In September 2013 EPA withdrew its 2010 draft BPA rule. saying the rule was "no longer necessary", because EPA was taking a different track at looking at chemicals, a so-called "Work Plan" of more than 80 chemicals for risk assessment and risk reduction. Another proposed rule that EPA withdrew would have limited industry's claims of confidential business information (CBI) for the health and safety studies needed, when new chemicals are submitted under TSCA for review. The EPA said it continued "to try to reduce unwarranted claims of confidentiality and has taken a number of significant steps that have had dramatic results... tightening policies for CBI claims and declassifying unwarranted confidentiality claims, challenging companies to review existing CBI claims to ensure that they are still valid and providing easier and enhanced access to a wider array of information."

The chemical industry group American Chemistry Council commended EPA for "choosing a course of action that will ultimately strengthen the performance of the nation's primary chemical management law." Richard Denison, senior scientist with the Environmental Defense Fund, commented "both rules were subject to intense opposition and lobbying from the chemical industry" and "Faced presumably with the reality that [the Office of Information and Regulatory Affairs] was never going to let EPA even propose the rules for public comment, EPA decided to withdraw them."

On 29 January 2014 EPA released a final alternatives assessment for BPA in thermal paper as part of its Design for the Environment program.

=== Chemical manufacturers reactions to bans ===
In March 2009 the six largest U.S. producers of baby bottles decided to stop using bisphenol A in their products. The same month Sunoco, a producer of gasoline and chemicals, refused to sell BPA to companies for use in food and water containers for children younger than 3, saying it could not be certain of the compound's safety. In May 2009, Lyndsey Layton from the Washington Post accused manufacturers of food and beverage containers and some of their biggest customers of the public relations and lobbying strategy to block government BPA bans. She noted that, "Despite more than 100 published studies by government scientists and university laboratories that have raised health concerns about the chemical, the Food and Drug Administration has deemed it safe largely because of two studies, both funded by a chemical industry trade group". In August 2009 the Milwaukee Journal Sentinel investigative series into BPA and its effects showed the Society of the Plastics Industry plans of a major public relations blitz to promote BPA, including plans to attack and discredit those who report or comment negatively on BPA and its effects.

==== BPA free, unknown substitute ====
The chemical industry over time responded to criticism of BPA by promoting "BPA-free" products. For example, in 2010, General Mills announced it had found a "BPA-free alternative" can liner that works with tomatoes. It said it would begin using the BPA-free alternative in tomato products sold by its organic foods subsidiary Muir Glen with that year's tomato harvest. As of 2014, General Mills has refused to state which alternative chemical it uses, and whether it uses it on any of its other canned products.

==== BPA free, epoxyfree ====
A minority of companies have stated what alternative compound(s) they use. Following an inquiry by Representative Edward Markey (D-Mass) seventeen companies replied saying they were going BPA-free, including Campbell's and General Mills Inc. None of the companies said they are or were going to use Bisphenol S; only four stated the alternative to BPA that they will be using. ConAgra stated in 2013 "alternate liners for tomatoes are vinyl...New aerosol cans are lined with polyester resin". Eden Foods stated that only their "beans are canned with a liner of an oleoresinous c-enamel that does not contain the endocrine disruptor BPA. Oleoresin is a mixture of oil and resin extracted from plants such as pine or balsam fir". Hain Celestial Group will use "modified polyester and/ or acrylic … by June 2014 for our canned soups, beans, and vegetables". Heinz stated in 2011 it "intend[s] to replace epoxy linings in all our food containers…. We have prioritized baby foods", and in 2012 "no BPA in any plastic containers we use".

==== BPA substitute BPS ====
Some "BPA free" plastics are made from epoxy containing a compound called bisphenol S (BPS). BPS shares a similar structure and versatility to BPA and has been used in numerous products from currency to thermal receipt paper. Widespread human exposure to BPS was confirmed in an analysis of urine samples taken in the U.S., Japan, China, and five other Asian countries. Researchers found BPS in all the receipt paper, 87 percent of the paper currency and 52 percent of recycled paper they tested. The study found that people may be absorbing 19 times more BPS through their skin than the amount of BPA they absorbed, when it was more widely used. In a 2011 study researchers looked at 455 common plastic products and found that 70% tested positive for estrogenic activity. After the products had been washed or microwaved the proportion rose to 95%. The study concluded: "Almost all commercially available plastic products we sampled, independent of the type of resin, product, or retail source, leached chemicals having reliably-detectable EA [endocrine activity], including those advertised as BPA-free. In some cases, BPA-free products released chemicals having more EA than BPA-containing products." A systematic review published in 2015 found that "based on the current literature, BPS and BPF are as hormonally active as BPA, and have endocrine disrupting effects."

==== Phenol-based substitutes ====
Among potential substitutes for BPA, phenol-based chemicals closely related to BPA have been identified. The non-extensive list includes bisphenol E (BPE), bisphenols B (BPB), 4-cumylphenol (HPP) and bisphenol F (BPF), with only BPS being currently used as main substitute in thermal paper.

== Degradation of BPA ==
=== Microbial degradation ===
The enzyme 4-hydroxyacetophenone monooxygenase, which can be found in Pseudomonas fluorescens, uses (4-hydroxyphenyl)ethan-1-one, NADPH, H^{+} and O_{2} to produce 4-hydroxyphenyl acetate, NADP^{+}, and H_{2}O.

The fungus Cunninghamella elegans is also able to degrade synthetic phenolic compounds like bisphenol A.

=== Plant degradation ===
Portulaca oleracea efficiently removes bisphenol A from a hydroponic solution. How this happens is unclear.

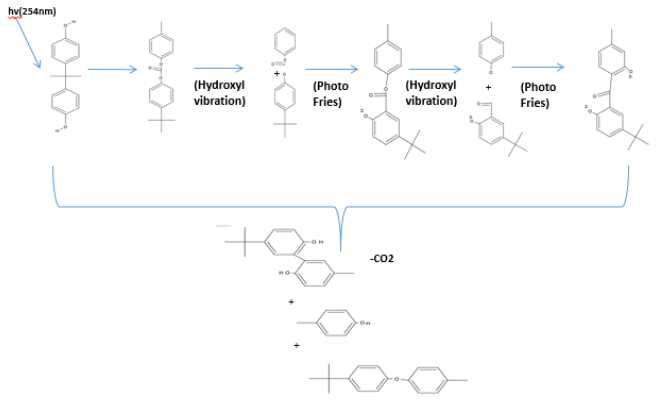
This is the Photo Fries Degradation of Bisphenol A, upon exposure to UV light.

=== Photodegradation ===
Photodegradation is BPA's main method of natural weathering in the environment, via the Photo Fries rearrangement. Experimentally, BPA has been shown to photodegrade in reactions catalyzed by zinc oxide, titanium dioxide, and tin dioxide, as methods of water decontamination procedures. The Photo Fries degradation is a complex rearrangement of the aromatic carbonate backbone of BPA into phenyl salicylate and dihydroxybenzophenone derivatives before the energized ring releases carbon dioxide. In aqueous solution, BPA shows UV absorption of wavelengths between 250 nm and 360 nm, and the Photo Fries degradation occurs at wavelengths less than 300 nm. The reaction begins by an alpha cleavage between the carbonyl carbon and the oxygen in the carbonate linkage, with the subsequent Photo Fries rearrangement of the products. Seen is the mechanism of the photodegradation of BPA by the Photo Fries reaction:

=== Combustion of BPA ===
This is the combustion reaction of Bisphenol A. Bisphenol A and oxygen reaction to form water and carbon dioxide.

Hydroxyl radicals are powerful oxidants that transform BPA into different forms of phenolic group compounds. The advanced photocatalytic oxidation of BPA, using compounds like sodium hypochlorite, NaOCl, as the oxidizing agent, can accelerate the degradation efficiency by releasing oxygen into the water. This decomposition occurs when BPA is exposed to UV irradiation. This release of oxygen, another strong oxidant, also causes BPA disintegration in aqueous conditions to produce carbon dioxide and water. The dissolved carbon dioxide in the water results in an increase of carbonic acid, therefore causing an acidification of the water.

=== Oxidation of BPA by ozone ===
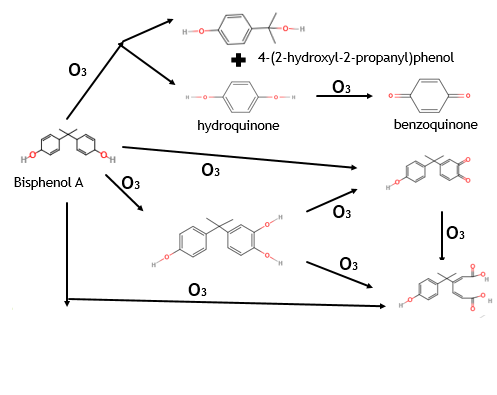
This is the reaction between Bisphenol A and ozone, and all of the products.

During water treatment, BPA can be removed through ozonation. A 2008 study has identified the degradation products of this reaction, through the use of liquid chromatography and mass spectrometry. The reaction of BPA and ozone is seen below:

Solutions of BPA and water decreased in pH after the ozonation process was completed. pH drops from 6.5 to 4.5 pH units were observed. This is likely because of the formation of carboxylic acids. These products were produced when the solution was 20±2 °C. The products have high molecular weight. Also, ozone is electrophilic, so reactions were between ozone and aromatic rings by electrophilic substitution.

==== Kinetics of BPA degradation ====
In 1991, the first explanation of the rate of BPA degradation through ozonation was determined.

$$-{d[BPA] \over dt} = k_\text{apparent}[BPA][O_3]$$

This relates the concentration of BPA to time by the apparent dissociation constant, concentration of BPA, and the concentration of ozone.
