= Bisphenol S =

- Bisphenol S

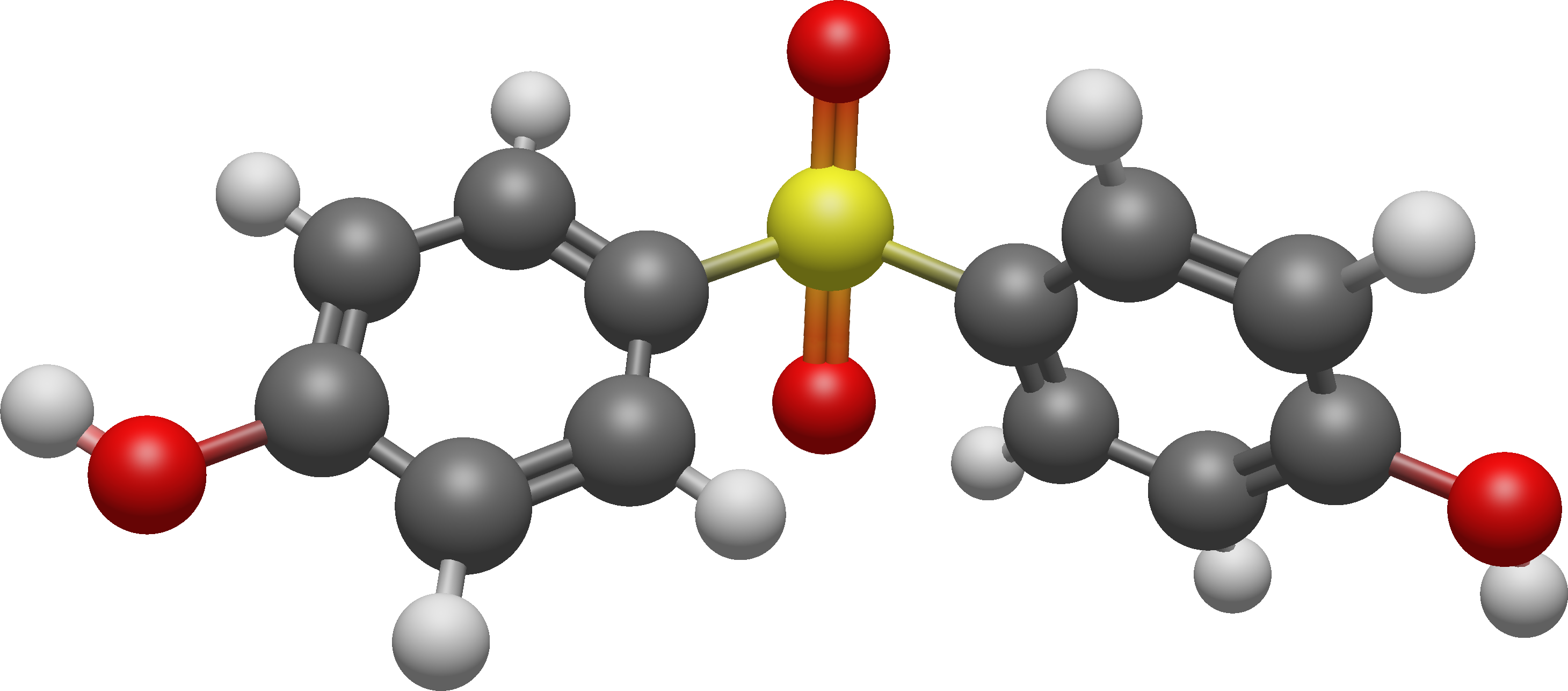
- Bisphenol S 3D BS

Names
- Preferred IUPAC name 4,4′-Sulfonyldiphenol
- Other names BPS, 4,4′-sulfonylbisphenol, Bis(4-hydroxyphenyl)sulfone

Identifiers
CAS Number	80-09-1
3D model (JSmol)	Interactive image; Interactive image
ChEBI	CHEBI:34372
ChEMBL	ChEMBL384441
ChemSpider	6374
ECHA InfoCard	100.001.137
EC Number	201-250-5
KEGG	C14216
PubChem CID	6626
UNII	3OX4RR782R
CompTox Dashboard (EPA)	DTXSID3022409
- InChI: InChI=1S/C12H10O4S/c13-9-1-5-11(6-2-9)17(15,16)12-7-3-10(14)4-8-12/h1-8,13-14H Key: VPWNQTHUCYMVMZ-UHFFFAOYSA-N; InChI=1/C12H10O4S/c13-9-1-5-11(6-2-9)17(15,16)12-7-3-10(14)4-8-12/h1-8,13-14H Key: VPWNQTHUCYMVMZ-UHFFFAOYAO
- SMILES: O=S(=O)(c1ccc(O)cc1)c2ccc(O)cc2; c1cc(ccc1O)S(=O)(=O)c2ccc(cc2)O

Properties
Chemical formula	C_{12}H_{10}O_{4}S
Molar mass	250.27 g·mol^{−1}
Appearance	White colorless solid; forms needle shaped crystals in water
Density	1.3663 g/cm^{3}
Melting point	245 to 250 °C (473 to 482 °F; 518 to 523 K)
Solubility in water	1100 mg/L
Solubility	Soluble in ethanol

Hazards
- GHS labelling
Pictograms	(GHS07: Exclamation mark) (GHS08: Health hazard)
Signal word	Warning
Hazard statements	H319, H361
Precautionary statements	P201, P202, P264, P280, P281, P305+P351+P338, P308+P313, P337+P313, P405, P501
- Except where otherwise noted, data are given for materials in their standard state (at 25 °C [77 °F], 100 kPa). verify (what is ?) Infobox references

Bisphenol S (BPS, dioxydiphenylsulfone) is an organic compound with the formula (HOC_{6}H_{4})_{2}SO_{2}. It has two phenol functional groups on either side of a sulfonyl group. It is commonly used in curing fast-drying epoxy resin adhesives. It is classified as a bisphenol, and a close molecular analog of bisphenol A (BPA). BPS differs from BPA in possessing a sulfone group (SO_{2}) as the central linker in the molecule instead of the dimethylmethylene group (C(CH_{3})_{2}) of bisphenol A.

== History ==
German chemist Ludwig Glutz (1844–1873) first prepared the compound from phenol and hot sulfuric acid in 1867, designating it oxysulphobenzide. It was used starting in 1869 as a dye.

BPS received the modern name in the late 1950s.

== Use ==
BPS is a precursor to the polyethersulfone called Victrex. BPS is also used as an anticorrosive agent in epoxy glues.

=== Occurrence in everyday life ===
BPS is used to a variety of common consumer products. In some cases, BPS is used as a replacement for BPA. BPS also has the advantage of being more stable to heat and light than BPA. BPS has also been reported to occur in canned foodstuffs, such as tin cans.

==== Paper products ====
Another study done on thermal receipt paper shows that 88% of human exposure to BPS from handling papers is through receipts.

The recycling of thermal paper can introduce BPS into the cycle of paper production and cause BPS contamination of other types of paper products.

In a 2015 study analyzing BPS in a variety of paper products worldwide, BPS was found in 100% of tickets, mailing envelopes, airplane boarding passes, and airplane luggage tags. In this study, very high concentrations of BPS were detected in thermal receipt samples collected from cities in the United States, Japan, Korea, and Vietnam. The BPS concentrations were large but varied greatly, from a few tens of nanograms per gram to several milligrams per gram. BPS is present in more than 70% of the household waste paper samples, potentially indicating spreading of BPS contamination through paper recycling. Nevertheless, concentrations of BPS used in thermal paper are usually lower compared to those of BPA. Finally, BPS can get into the human body through dermal absorption from handling banknotes.

==== Bisphenol-S concentrations within populations ====
A relationship to higher BPS concentrations is linked to individuals within certain socio-economic classes hence placing those individuals at greater risk of possible deleterious effects. Individuals with an annual income of less than $20,000 were found to have the highest concentrations of bisphenol and individuals with an annual income of $75,000 or more to have the lowest concentrations, suggesting a linear relationship between bodily concentrations of BPS and income. Black women had the highest concentrations of BPS with levels 93% higher than those of white women.

== Biodegradation ==
BPS is more resistant to environmental degradation than BPA, and although not persistent cannot be characterised as readily biodegradable.

== Regulation ==
In the United States, it can be difficult for consumers to determine if a product contains bisphenol S due to limited labeling regulations. As of December 2023, bisphenol S is recognized by the State of California as a reproductive toxicant.

In January 2023, the European Chemicals Agency added bisphenol S to the candidate list as a substance of very high concern, while under investigation for its potential to cause reproductive toxicity and endocrine disruption.

== Synthesis ==
Bisphenol S is prepared by the reaction of two equivalents of phenol with one equivalent of sulfuric acid or oleum.

2 C_{6}H_{5}OH + H_{2}SO_{4} → (C_{6}H_{4}OH)_{2}SO_{2} + 2 H_{2}O

2 C_{6}H_{5}OH + SO_{3} → (C_{6}H_{4}OH)_{2}SO_{2} + H_{2}O

This reaction can also produce 2,4'-sulfonyldiphenol, a common isomeric complication in electrophilic aromatic substitution reactions.

Chemical reaction to bisphenol S

== See also ==
- Bisphenol A (BPA)
- Tetrabromobisphenol A (TBBPA)
- Bisphenol F (BPF)
- Tetramethyl Bisphenol F (TMBPF)
