= Tetramethyl bisphenol F =

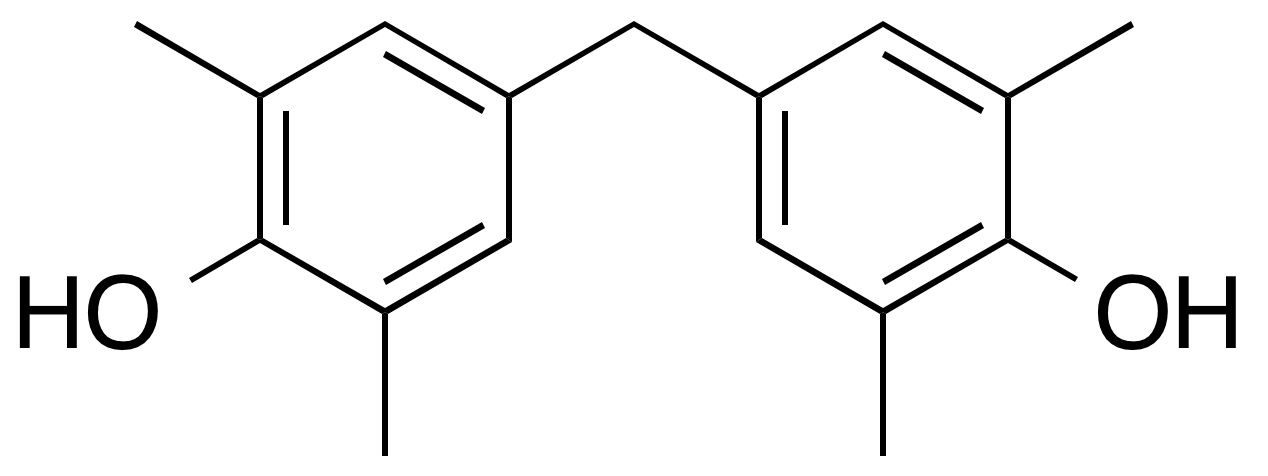

Names
- Preferred IUPAC name 4,4′-Methylenebis(2,6-dimethylphenol)
- Other names TMBPF, TM-BFP, tetramethyl bisphenol F, valPure V70

Identifiers
CAS Number	5384-21-4
3D model (JSmol)	Interactive image
ChEMBL	ChEMBL593206
ChemSpider	71665
ECHA InfoCard	100.023.980
EC Number	226-378-9
PubChem CID	79345
UNII	JH6FV2EG7J
CompTox Dashboard (EPA)	DTXSID4063820
- InChI: InChI=1S/C17H20O2/c1-10-5-14(6-11(2)16(10)18)9-15-7-12(3)17(19)13(4)8-15/h5-8,18-19H,9H2,1-4H3 Key: AZZWZMUXHALBCQ-UHFFFAOYSA-N
- SMILES: CC1=CC(=CC(=C1O)C)CC2=CC(=C(C(=C2)C)O)C

Properties
Chemical formula	C_{17}H_{20}O_{2}
Molar mass	256.345 g·mol^{−1}

Hazards
- GHS labelling
Pictograms	(GHS07: Exclamation mark) (GHS09: Environmental hazard)
Signal word	Warning
Hazard statements	H315, H319, H335, H400
Precautionary statements	P261, P264, P264+P265, P271, P273, P280, P302+P352, P304+P340, P305+P351+P338, P319, P321, P332+P317, P337+P317, P362+P364, P391, P403+P233, P405, P501
- Except where otherwise noted, data are given for materials in their standard state (at 25 °C [77 °F], 100 kPa). Infobox references

Tetramethyl bisphenol F (TMBPF) is a bisphenol monomer intended as an alternative for bisphenol A and bisphenol F to use in epoxy linings of aluminium cans and steel cans. It was previously suggested as an insulator in electronic circuit boards.

Polymerization of tetramethyl bisphenol F occurs with epichlorohydrin when heated between 40 and 70 °C using an alkali as a catalyst to form the resin used as a coating.

== Synthesis ==
TMBPF can be synthesised by a reaction of 2,6-xylenol and formaldehyde. Typically formalin is used, which is a 37% solution of formaldehyde. The reaction is acid-catalysed. As such, sulfuric acid is commonly added to the reaction mixture.

== Health and environmental effects ==
Causes serious eye irritation. May cause respiratory and skin irritation. Very toxic to aquatic life.

=== Human endocrine effects ===
TMBPF does not have any effect on the endocrine system; it does not leach out of cans because unlike BPA it is fully polymerized when deposited on the metal, so there is no free chemical to leach out. Tetramethyl bisphenol F was tested on rats to see if there were effects like male or female hormones. It had almost no effects like this. However, a different study did find effects.
