= Bisphenol A =

Chemical used in plastics, xenoestrogen

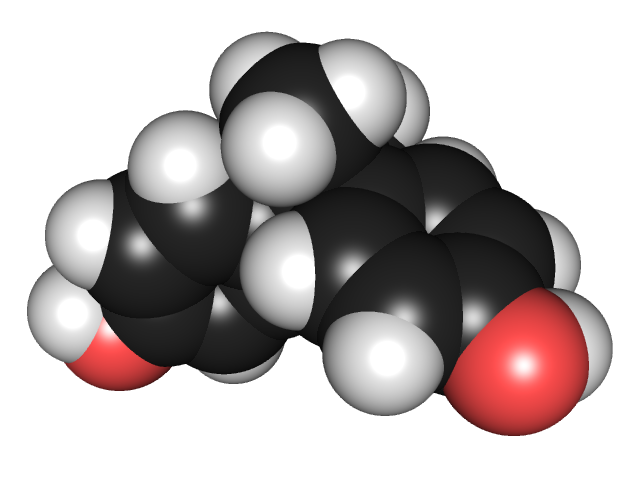

Names
- Preferred IUPAC name 4,4′-(Propane-2,2-diyl)diphenol
- Other names: Bisphenol acetone; BPA; Diphenylolpropane; p,p-Isopropylidenebisphenol; 2,2-Bis(4-hydroxyphenyl)propane; 2,2-Di(4-phenylol)propane

Identifiers
CAS Number	80-05-7
3D model (JSmol)	Interactive image; Interactive image
ChEBI	CHEBI:33216
ChEMBL	ChEMBL418971
ChemSpider	6371
DrugBank	DB06973
ECHA InfoCard	100.001.133
EC Number	201-245-8
IUPHAR/BPS	7865
KEGG	C13624
PubChem CID	6623
RTECS number	SL6300000
UNII	MLT3645I99
UN number	2430
CompTox Dashboard (EPA)	DTXSID7020182
- InChI: InChI=1S/C15H16O2/c1-15(2,11-3-7-13(16)8-4-11)12-5-9-14(17)10-6-12/h3-10,16-17H,1-2H3 Key: IISBACLAFKSPIT-UHFFFAOYSA-N; InChI=1/C15H16O2/c1-15(2,11-3-7-13(16)8-4-11)12-5-9-14(17)10-6-12/h3-10,16-17H,1-2H3 Key: IISBACLAFKSPIT-UHFFFAOYAI
- SMILES: Oc1ccc(cc1)C(c2ccc(O)cc2)(C)C; CC(C)(c1ccc(cc1)O)c2ccc(cc2)O

Properties
Chemical formula	C_{15}H_{16}O_{2}
Molar mass	228.291 g·mol^{−1}
Appearance	White solid
Odor	Phenolic, medical
Density	1.217 g/cm^{3}
Melting point	155 °C (311 °F; 428 K)
Boiling point	250–252 °C (482–486 °F; 523–525 K) at 13 torrs (0.017 atm)
Solubility in water	0.3 g/L (25 °C)
log P	3.41
Vapor pressure	5×10^{−6} Pa (25 °C)

Hazards
- GHS labelling
Pictograms	(GHS05: Corrosive) (GHS07: Exclamation mark) (GHS08: Health hazard) (GHS09: Environmental hazard)
Signal word	Danger
Hazard statements	H317, H318, H335, H360, H411
Precautionary statements	P201, P202, P261, P273, P302+P352, P304+P340, P305+P351+P338, P308+P313, P333+P313, P363, P403+P233
NFPA 704 (fire diamond)	2 1 0
Flash point	227 °C (441 °F; 500 K)
Autoignition temperature	510 °C (950 °F; 783 K)
- Except where otherwise noted, data are given for materials in their standard state (at 25 °C [77 °F], 100 kPa). verify (what is ?) Infobox references

Bisphenol A (BPA) is a chemical compound primarily used in the manufacturing of various plastics. It is a colourless solid which is soluble in most common organic solvents, but has very poor solubility in water. BPA is produced on an industrial scale by the condensation reaction of phenol and acetone. Global production in 2022 was estimated to be in the region of 10 million tonnes.

BPA's largest single application is as a co-monomer in the production of polycarbonates, which accounts for 65–70% of all BPA production. The manufacturing of epoxy resins and vinyl ester resins account for 25–30% of BPA use. The remaining 5% is used as a major component of several high-performance plastics, and as a minor additive in polyvinyl chloride (PVC), polyurethane, thermal paper, and several other materials. It is not a plasticizer, although it is often wrongly labelled as such.

The health effects of BPA have been the subject of prolonged public and scientific debate. BPA is a xenoestrogen, exhibiting hormone-like properties that mimic the effects of estrogen in the body. Although the effect is very weak, the pervasiveness of BPA-containing materials raises concerns, as exposure is effectively lifelong. Many BPA-containing materials are non-obvious but commonly encountered, and include coatings for the inside of food cans, clothing designs, shop receipts, dental fillings, and repair linings of water main pipes. BPA has been investigated by public health agencies in many countries, as well as by the World Health Organization.

While normal exposure is below the level currently associated with risk, several jurisdictions have taken steps to reduce exposure on a precautionary basis, in particular by banning BPA from baby bottles. There is some evidence that BPA exposure in infants has decreased as a result of this. BPA-free plastics have also been introduced, which are manufactured using alternative bisphenols such as bisphenol S and bisphenol F, but there is also controversy around whether these are actually safer.

== History ==
Bisphenol A was first reported in 1891 by the Russian chemist Aleksandr Dianin.

In 1934, workers at I.G. Farbenindustrie reported the coupling of BPA and epichlorohydrin. Over the following decade, coatings and resins derived from similar materials were described by workers at the companies of DeTrey Freres in Switzerland and DeVoe and Raynolds in the US. This early work underpinned the development of epoxy resins, which in turn motivated production of BPA. The utilization of BPA further expanded with discoveries at Bayer and General Electric on polycarbonate plastics. These plastics first appeared in 1958, being produced by Mobay, General Electric, and Bayer.

The British biochemist Edward Charles Dodds tested BPA as an artificial estrogen in the early 1930s. Subsequent work found that it bound to estrogen receptors tens of thousands of times more weakly than estradiol, the major natural female sex hormone. Dodds eventually developed a structurally similar compound, diethylstilbestrol (DES), which was used as a synthetic estrogen drug in women and animals until it was banned due to its risk of causing cancer; the ban on use of DES in humans came in 1971 and in animals, in 1979. BPA was never used as a drug.

== Production ==
The synthesis of BPA still follows Dianin's general method, with the fundamentals changing little in 130 years. The condensation of acetone (hence the suffix 'A' in the name) with two equivalents of phenol is catalyzed by a strong acid, such as concentrated hydrochloric acid, sulfuric acid, or a solid acid resin such as the sulfonic acid form of polystyrene sulfonate. An excess of phenol is used to ensure full condensation and to limit the formation of byproducts, such as Dianin's compound. BPA is fairly cheap to produce, as the synthesis benefits from a high atom economy and large amounts of both starting materials are available from the cumene process. As the only by-product is water, it may be considered an industrial example of green chemistry. Global production in 2022 was estimated to be in the region of 10 million tonnes.

Usually, the addition of acetone takes place at the para position on both phenols, however minor amounts of the ortho-para (up to 3%) and ortho-ortho isomers are also produced, along with several other minor by‑products. These are not always removed and are known impurities in commercial samples of BPA.

== Properties ==
BPA has a fairly high melting point but can be easily dissolved in a broad range of organic solvents including toluene, ethanol and ethyl acetate. It may be purified by recrystallisation from acetic acid with water. Crystals form in the monoclinic space group P 2_{1}/n (where n indicates the glide plane); within this individual molecules of BPA are arranged with a 91.5° torsion angle between the phenol rings. Spectroscopic data is available from AIST.

== Uses and applications ==
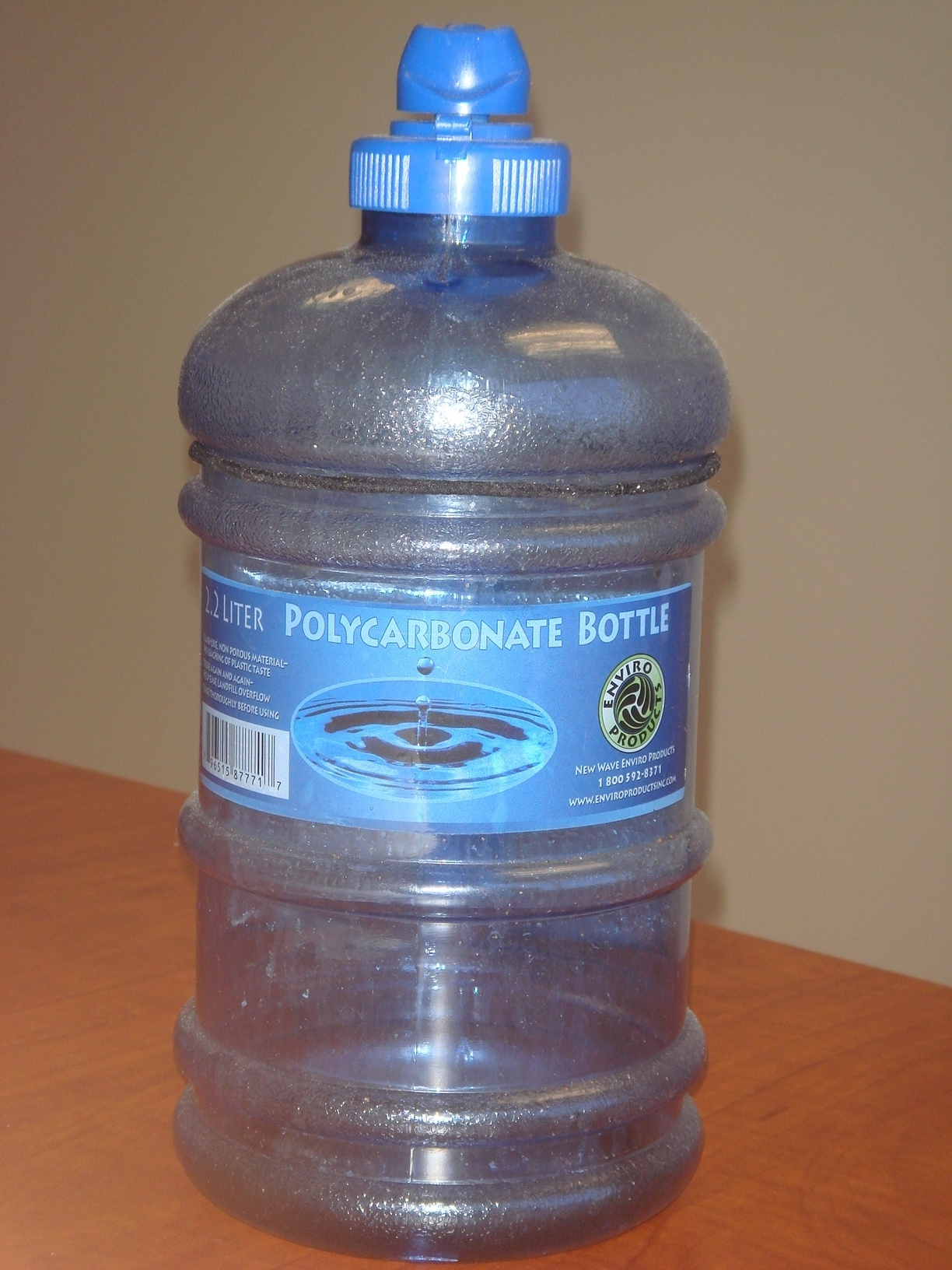
Bisphenol A is primarily used to make plastics, such as this polycarbonate water bottle.

=== Main uses ===
==== Polycarbonates ====
About 65–70% of all bisphenol A is used to make polycarbonate plastics, which can consist of nearly 90% BPA by mass. Polymerisation is achieved by a reaction with phosgene, conducted under biphasic conditions; the hydrochloric acid is scavenged with aqueous base. This process converts the individual molecules of BPA into large polymer chains, effectively trapping them.

==== Epoxy and vinyl ester resins ====
About 25–30% of all BPA is used in the manufacture of epoxy resins and vinyl ester resins. For epoxy resin, it is first converted to its diglycidyl ether (usually abbreviated BADGE or DGEBA). This is achieved by a reaction with epichlorohydrin under basic conditions.

Some of this is further reacted with methacrylic acid to form bis-GMA, which is used to make vinyl ester resins. Alternatively, and to a much lesser extent, BPA may be ethoxylated and then converted to its diacrylate and dimethacrylate derivatives (bis-EMA, or EBPADMA). These may be incorporated at low levels in vinyl ester resins to change their physical properties and see common use in dental composites and sealants.

=== Minor uses ===
The remaining 5% of BPA is used in a wide range of applications, many of which involve plastic. BPA is a major component of several high-performance plastics, the production of these is low compared to other plastics but still equals several thousand tons a year. Comparatively minor amounts of BPA are also used as additives or modifiers in some commodity plastics. These materials are much more common but their BPA content will be low.

==== Plastics ====
As a major component

- Polycyanurates and cyanate ester resins can be produced from BPA by way of its dicyanate ester (BADCy). This is formed by a reaction between BPA and cyanogen bromide. Examples include BT-Epoxy, which is one of a number of resins used in the production of printed circuit boards.
- Polyetherimides such as Ultem can be produced from BPA via a nitro-displacement of appropriate bisnitroimides. These thermoplastic polyimide plastics have exceptional resistance to mechanical, thermal and chemical damage. They are used in medical devices and other high performance instrumentation.
- Polybenzoxazines may be produced from a number of biphenols, including BPA.
- Polysulfones can be produced from BPA and bis(4-chlorophenyl) sulfone forming poly(bisphenol-A sulfone) (PSF). It is used as a high performance alternative to polycarbonate.
- Bisphenol-A formaldehyde resins are a subset of phenol formaldehyde resins. They are used in the production of high-pressure laminates

As a minor component

- Polyurethane can incorporate BPA and its derivatives as hard segment chain extenders, particularly in memory foams.
- PVC can contain BPA and its derivatives through multiple routes. BPA is sometimes used as an antioxidant in phthalates, which are extensively used as plasticizers for PVC. BPA has also been used as an antioxidant to protect sensitive PVC heat stabilizers. Historically 5–10% by weight of BPA was included in barium-cadmium types, although these have largely been phased out due to health concerns surrounding the cadmium. BPA diglycidyl ether (BADGE) is used as an acid scavenger, particularly in PVC dispersions, such as organosols or plastisols, which are used as coatings for the inside of food cans, as well as embossed clothes designs produced using heat transfer vinyl or screen printing machines.

Derivatives used as flame retardants

BPA is used to form a number of flame retardants used in plastics.

Tetrabromobisphenol A (TBBPA)

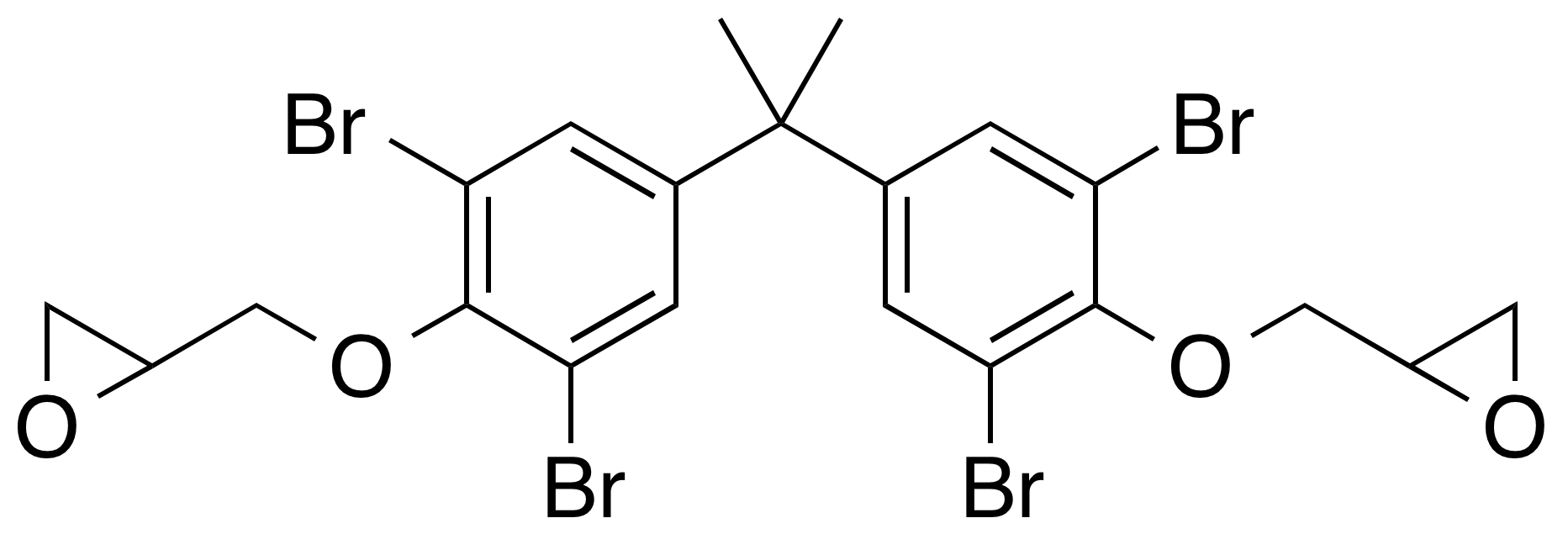
Tetrabromobisphenol A diglycidyl ether (TBBPA-DE)

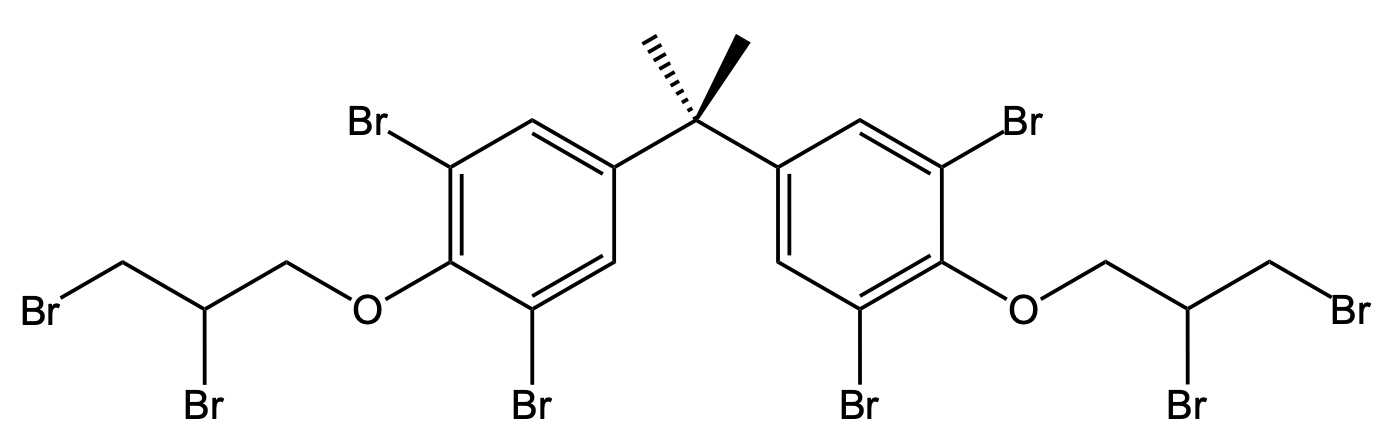
Tetrabromobisphenol A bis(2,3-dibromopropyl) ether (TBBPA-DBPE)

Bisphenol A diphenyl phosphate (BADP)

Bromination of BPA forms tetrabromobisphenol A (TBBPA), which is mainly used as a reactive component of polymers, meaning that it is incorporated into the polymer backbone. It is used to prepare fire-resistant polycarbonates by replacing some bisphenol A. Its epoxy derivative (TBBPA-DE) is used to prepare epoxy resins, used in printed circuit boards. TBBPA is also converted to TBBPA-BDBPE which can be used as a flame retardant in polypropylene. TBBPA-BDBPE is not chemically bonded to the polymer and can leach out into the environment. The use of these compounds is diminishing due to restrictions on brominated flame retardants. The reaction of BPA with phosphorus oxychloride and phenol forms BADP, which is used as a liquid flame retarder in some high performance polymer blends such as polycarbonate/ABS mixtures that are used to form the casings for household electronics.

==== Other applications ====
- BPA is used as an antioxidant in several fields, particularly in brake fluids.
- BPA is used as a developing agent in thermal paper (shop receipts). Recycled paper products can also contain BPA, although this can depend strongly on how it is recycled. Deinking can remove 95% of BPA, with the pulp produced used to make newsprint, toilet paper and facial tissues. If deinking is not performed then the BPA remains in the fibers, paper recycled this way is usually made into corrugated fiberboard.
- Ethoxylated BPA finds minor use as a 'levelling agent' in tin electroplating.
- Several drug candidates have also been developed from bisphenol A, including ralaniten, ralaniten acetate, and EPI-001.

== BPA substitutes ==
Concerns about the health effects of BPA have led some manufacturers replacing it with other bisphenols, such as bisphenol S and bisphenol F. These are produced in a similar manner to BPA, by replacing acetone with other compounds, which undergo analogous condensation reactions. Thus, in bisphenol F, the F signifies formaldehyde. Health concerns have also been raised about these substitutes. Alternative polymers, such as tritan copolyester have been developed to give the same properties as polycarbonate (durable, clear) without using BPA or its analogues.

Structural formula	Name	CAS	Reactants	
Bisphenol AF	Bisphenol AF	1478-61-1	Phenol	Hexafluoroacetone
Bisphenol F	Bisphenol F	620-92-8	Phenol	Formaldehyde
Bisphenol S	Bisphenol S	80-09-1	Phenol	Sulfur trioxide
Bisphenol Z	Bisphenol Z	843-55-0	Phenol	Cyclohexanone
	Tetramethyl bisphenol F	5384-21-4	2,6-xylenol	Formaldehyde

== Human safety ==
=== Exposure ===
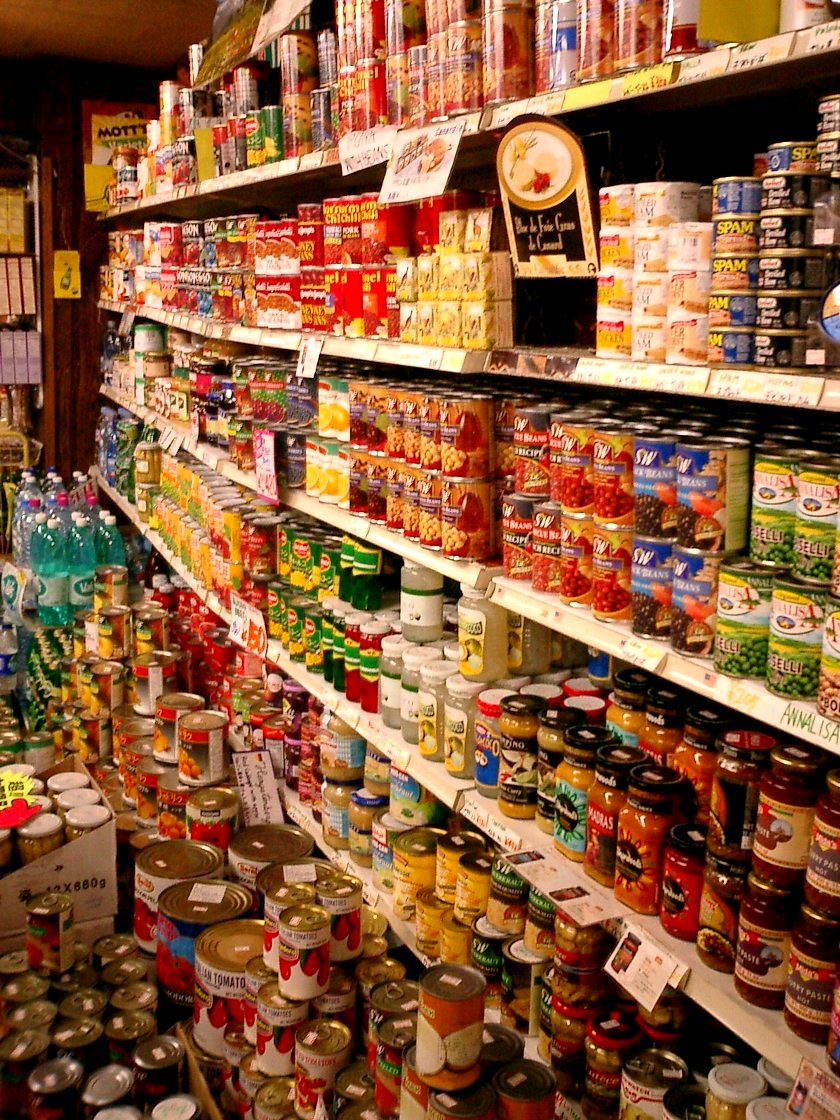
The largest exposure humans have had to BPA is from food packaging, particularly the epoxy lining of metal food, beverage cans and plastic bottles.

As a result of the presence of BPA in plastics and other commonplace materials, most people are frequently exposed to trace levels of BPA. The primary source of human exposure is via food, as epoxy and PVC are used to line the inside of food cans to prevent corrosion of the metal by acidic foodstuffs. Polycarbonate drink containers are also a source of exposure, although most disposable drink bottles are actually made of PET, which contains no BPA. Among the non-food sources, exposure routes include through dust, thermal paper, clothing, dental materials, and medical devices.

Although BPA exposure is common, it does not accumulate within the body, with toxicokinetic studies showing the biological half-life of BPA in adult humans to be around two to five hours. During its elimination, the body first converts BPA into more water-soluble compounds via glucuronidation or sulfation, which are then removed from the body through urine. This allows exposure to be easily determined by urine testing, facilitating convenient biomonitoring of populations. Food and drink containers made from Bisphenol A-containing plastics do not contaminate the content to cause any increased cancer risk.

=== Health effects and regulation ===
The health effects of BPA have been the subject of prolonged public and scientific discourse, with PubMed listing more than 20,000 scientific journal papers on the topic, as of 2026. Concern is mostly related to its estrogen-like activity, although it can interact with other receptor systems as an endocrine-disrupting chemical. These interactions are all very weak, but exposure to BPA is effectively lifelong, leading to concern over possible cumulative effects.

Studying this sort of long‑term, low‑dose interaction is difficult, and although there have been numerous studies, there are considerable discrepancies in their conclusions regarding the nature of the effects observed as well as the levels at which they occur. A common criticism is that industry-sponsored trials tend to show BPA as being safer than studies performed by academic or government laboratories, although this has also been explained in terms of industry studies being better designed.

In the 2010s public health agencies in the EU, US, Canada, Australia and Japan as well as the WHO all reviewed the health risks of BPA. The difficulties in determining a robust no-observed-adverse-effect level meant that it was not possible to conclude whether the risks were adequately controlled and due to this many jurisdictions continued to take steps to reduce exposure on a precautionary basis. In particular, infants were considered to be at greater risk, leading to bans on the use of BPA in baby bottles and related products by the US, Canada, and EU amongst others.

Bottle producers largely switched from polycarbonate to polypropylene and there is some evidence that BPA exposure in infants has decreased as a result of this. The European Food Safety Authority completed a re-evaluation into the risks of BPA in 2023, concluding that its tolerable daily intake should be greatly reduced. This led the European Union to ban BPA in all the food contact materials, including plastic and coated packaging, in December of 2024. The ban will come into force after an implementation period of up to three years.

BPA exhibits very low acute toxicity (i.e. from a single large dose) as indicated by its LD_{50} of 4 g/kg (mouse). Reports indicate that it is a minor skin irritant as well, although less so than phenol.

=== Pharmacology ===
An overlay of estradiol, the major female sex hormone in humans (green) and BPA (purple). This displays the structure–activity relationship which allows BPA to mimic the effects of estradiol and other estrogens.

BPA has been found to interact with a diverse range of hormone receptors, in both humans and animals. It binds to both of the nuclear estrogen receptors (ERs), ERα and ERβ. BPA is a selective estrogen receptor modulator (SERM), or partial agonist of the ER, so it can serve as both an estrogen agonist and antagonist. However, it is 1,000- to 2,000-fold less potent than estradiol, the major female sex hormone in humans. At high concentrations, BPA also binds to and acts as an antagonist of the androgen receptor (AR). In addition to receptor binding, the compound has been found to affect Leydig cell steroidogenesis, including affecting 17α-hydroxylase/17,20 lyase and aromatase expression and interfering with LH receptor-ligand binding.

Bisphenol A's interacts with the estrogen-related receptor γ (ERR-γ). This orphan receptor (endogenous ligand unknown) behaves as a constitutive activator of transcription. BPA seems to bind strongly to ERR-γ (dissociation constant = 5.5 nM), but only weakly to the ER. BPA binding to ERR-γ preserves its basal constitutive activity. It can also protect it from deactivation from the SERM 4-hydroxytamoxifen (afimoxifene). This may be the mechanism by which BPA acts as a xenoestrogen. Different expression of ERR-γ in different parts of the body may account for variations in bisphenol A effects. BPA has also been found to act as an agonist of the GPER (GPR30).

== Environmental safety ==
=== Distribution and degradation ===
BPA has been detectable in the natural environment since the 1990s and is now widely distributed. It is primarily a river pollutant, but has also been observed in the marine environment, in soils, and lower levels can also be detected in air. The solubility of BPA in water is low (~300 g per ton of water) but this is still sufficient to make it a significant means of distribution into the environment. Many of the largest sources of BPA pollution are water-based, particularly wastewater from industrial facilities using BPA. Paper recycling can be a major source of release when this includes thermal paper, leaching from PVC items may also be a significant source, as can landfill leachate.

In all cases, wastewater treatment can be highly effective at removing BPA, giving reductions of 91–98%. Regardless, the remaining 2–9% of BPA will continue through to the environment, with low levels of BPA commonly observed in surface water and sediment in the US and Europe.

Once in the environment BPA is aerobically biodegraded by a wide a variety of organisms. Its half life in water has been estimated at between 4.5 and 15 days, degradation in the air is faster than this, while soil samples degrade more slowly. BPA in sediment degrades most slowly of all, particularly where this is anaerobic. Abiotic degradation has been reported, but is generally slower than biodegradation. Pathways include photo-oxidation, or reactions with minerals such as goethite which may be present in soils and sediments.

=== Environmental effects ===
BPA is an environmental contaminant of emerging concern. Despite its short half-life and non-bioaccumulating character, the continuous release of BPA into the environment causes continuous exposure to both plant and animal life. Although many studies have been performed, these often focus on a limited range of model organisms and can use BPA concentrations well beyond environmental levels. As such, the precise effects of BPA on the growth, reproduction, and development of aquatic organisms are not fully understood. Regardless, the existing data shows the effects of BPA on wildlife to be generally negative. BPA appears able to affect development and reproduction in a wide range of wildlife, with certain species being particularly sensitive, such as invertebrates and amphibians.

== See also ==
Structurally related

- 4,4'-Dihydroxybenzophenone - used as a UV stabilizer in cosmetics and plastics
- Dinitrobisphenol A - a proposed metabolite of BPA, which may show increased endocrine disrupting character
- HPTE - a metabolite of the synthetic insecticide methoxychlor

Others

- 2,2,4,4-Tetramethyl-1,3-cyclobutanediol - next generation BPA replacement
- 4-tert-Butylphenol - used as a chain-length regulator in the production of polycarbonates and epoxy resins, it has also been studied as a potential endocrine disruptor
