= Bisphenol F =

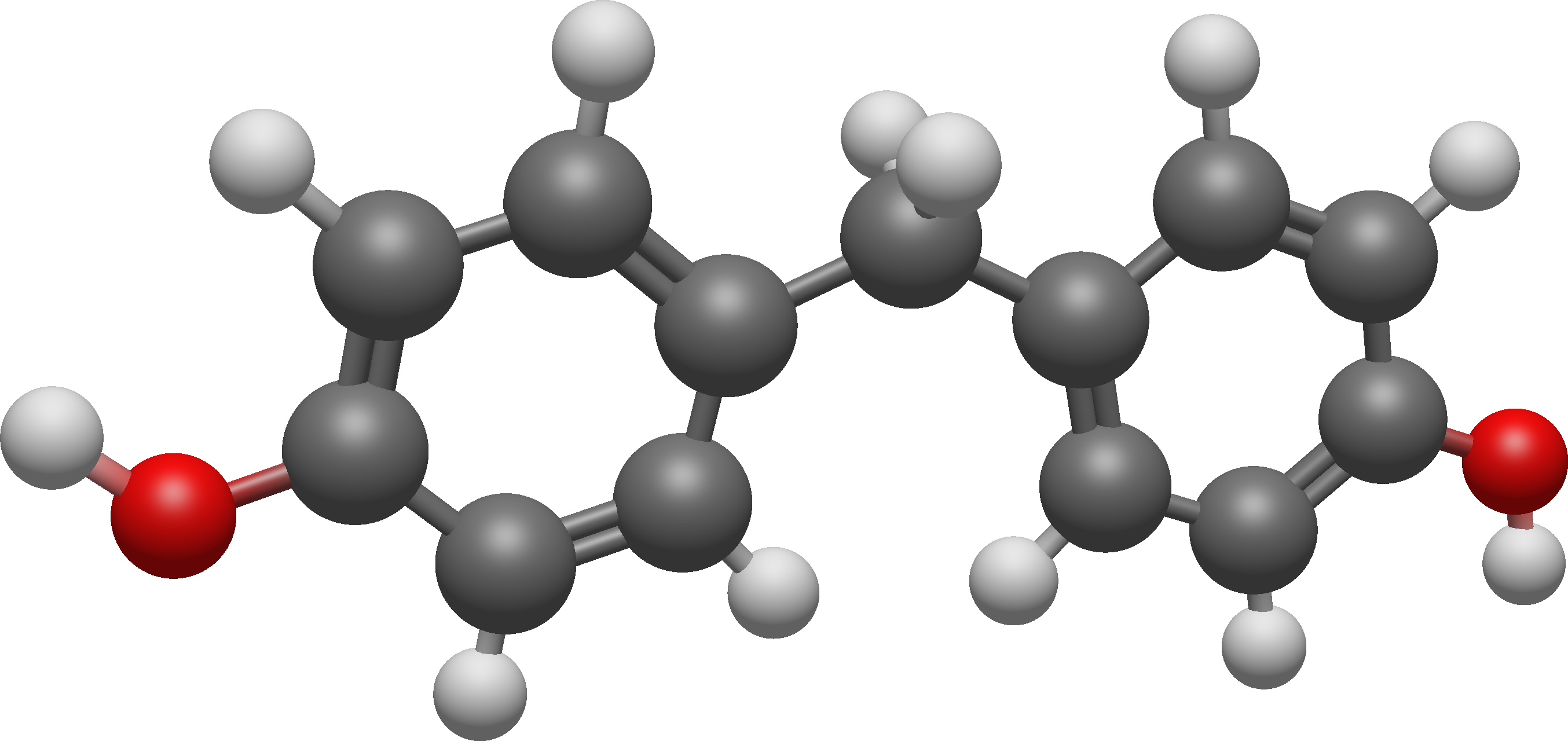

Names
- Preferred IUPAC name 4,4′-Methylenediphenol
- Other names BPF; 4,4′-Dihydroxydiphenylmethane

Identifiers
CAS Number	620-92-8
3D model (JSmol)	Interactive image
ChemSpider	11614
ECHA InfoCard	100.009.691
PubChem CID	12111
UNII	QD2C19044Z
CompTox Dashboard (EPA)	DTXSID9022445
- InChI: InChI=1S/C13H12O2/c14-12-5-1-10(2-6-12)9-11-3-7-13(15)8-4-11/h1-8,14-15H,9H2 Key: PXKLMJQFEQBVLD-UHFFFAOYSA-N; InChI=1/C13H12O2/c14-12-5-1-10(2-6-12)9-11-3-7-13(15)8-4-11/h1-8,14-15H,9H2 Key: PXKLMJQFEQBVLD-UHFFFAOYAW
- SMILES: c1cc(ccc1Cc2ccc(cc2)O)O

Properties
Chemical formula	C_{13}H_{12}O_{2}
Molar mass	200.237 g·mol^{−1}
Appearance	colorless or white solid
Melting point	162.5 °C (324.5 °F; 435.6 K)
Boiling point	237–243 °C (459–469 °F; 510–516 K) 12-13 Torr
- Except where otherwise noted, data are given for materials in their standard state (at 25 °C [77 °F], 100 kPa). Infobox references

Bisphenol F (BPF; 4,4′-dihydroxydiphenylmethane) is an organic compound with the chemical formula (HOC_{6}H_{4})_{2}CH_{2}. It is structurally related to bisphenol A (BPA), a popular precursor for forming plastics, as both belong to the category of molecules known as bisphenols, which feature two phenol groups connected via a linking group. In BPF, the two aromatic rings are linked by a methylene connecting group. In response to concern about the health effects of BPA, BPF is increasingly used as a substitute for BPA.

== Uses ==
BPF is used in the manufacture of plastics and epoxy resins. It is used in the production of tank and pipe linings, industrial flooring, road and bridge deck toppings, structural adhesives, grouts, coatings and electrical varnishes. BPF is also utilized in liners, lacquers, adhesives, plastics, and the coating of drinks and food cans. BPF is found in dental materials, such as restorative materials, liners, adhesives, oral prosthetic devices and tissue substitutes.

== Biological effects ==
=== Pharmacokinetics ===
BPF undergoes two primary phase II biotransformations to form the corresponding glucuronide and sulfate.

=== Toxicity evaluation ===
BPF is under preliminary research to determine its potential toxicity, which may include airway irritation if BPF dust is inhaled, and an allergic reaction if it is in contact with the skin.

== Environmental contamination ==
BPF is pervasive in the environment, appearing in river water, drinking water, and agricultural soil samples. Biodegradation appears to be the most promising route for removal of BPA and related bisphenols. One degradation process converts BPA to the corresponding benzophenone (HOC_{6}H_{4})_{2}CO, which is relatively labile.
