= Tetrabromobisphenol A diglycidyl ether =

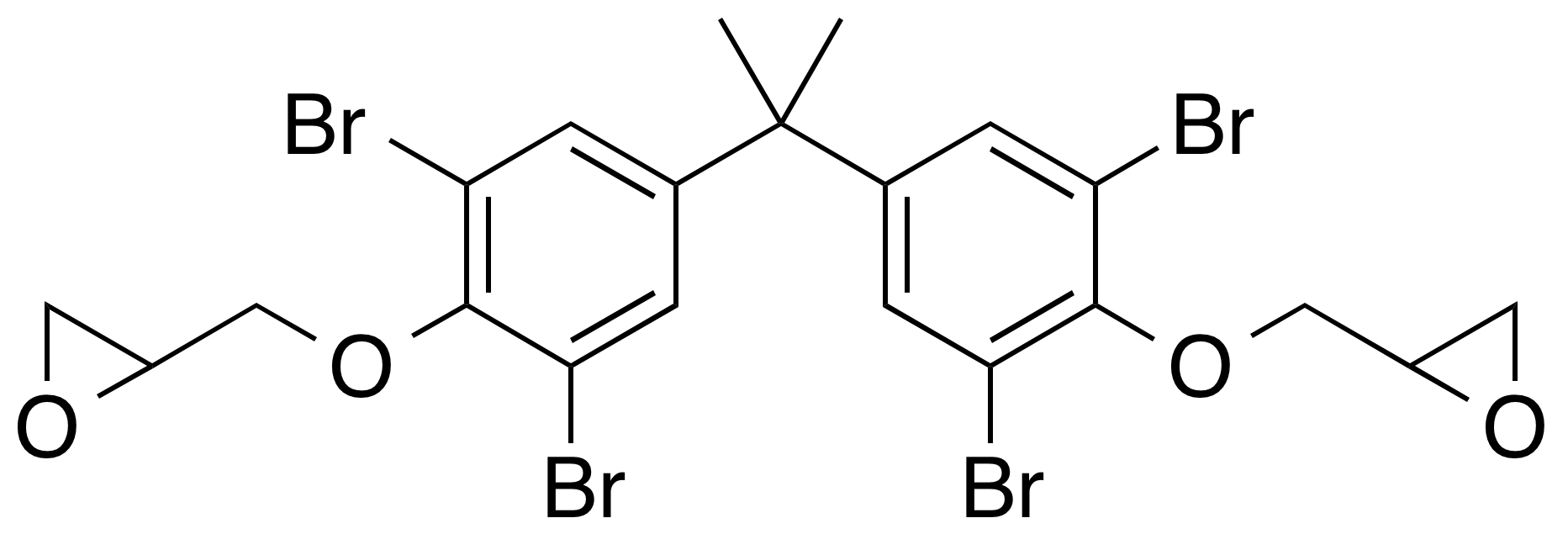

Names
- IUPAC name 2-[[2,6-dibromo-4-[2-[3,5-dibromo-4-(oxiran-2-ylmethoxy)phenyl]propan-2-yl]phenoxy]methyl]oxirane

Identifiers
CAS Number	3072-84-2
3D model (JSmol)	Interactive image
ChEMBL	ChEMBL2392655
ChemSpider	56055
EC Number	221-346-0
PubChem CID	62250
CompTox Dashboard (EPA)	DTXSID0052700
- InChI: InChI=1S/C21H20Br4O4/c1-21(2,11-3-15(22)19(16(23)4-11)28-9-13-7-26-13)12-5-17(24)20(18(25)6-12)29-10-14-8-27-14/h3-6,13-14H,7-10H2,1-2H3 Key: ZJRAAAWYHORFHN-UHFFFAOYSA-N
- SMILES: CC(C)(C1=CC(=C(C(=C1)Br)OCC2CO2)Br)C3=CC(=C(C(=C3)Br)OCC4CO4)Br

Properties
Chemical formula	C_{21}H_{20}Br_{4}O_{4}
Molar mass	656.003 g·mol^{−1}
- Except where otherwise noted, data are given for materials in their standard state (at 25 °C [77 °F], 100 kPa). Infobox references

Tetrabromobisphenol A diglycidyl ether is an epoxy resin consisting of tetrabromobisphenol A with ether linkages to two epichlorohydrin groups. An alternative structural comparison is as brominated form of bisphenol A diglycidyl ether. It is a brominated aromatic chemical used principally for giving flame retardant properties to materials. It is TSCA and REACH registered and has the molecular formula C_{21}H_{20}Br_{4}O_{4}. The IUPAC name is 2-{[2,6-dibromo-4-(2-{3,5-dibromo-4-[(oxiran-2-yl)methoxy]phenyl}propan-2-yl)phenoxy]methyl}oxirane.

== Synthesis ==
A method of synthesis is to take tetrabromobisphenol A and react with epichlorohydrin using a base to form the halohydrin. This species is then further reacted with sodium hydroxide to form the diglycidyl ether. Higher molecular weight epoxy resins with bromine atoms along the chain maybe synthesized by reacting standard epoxy resin with tetrabromobisphenol A in a technique called advancement.

== Uses ==
Its primary use is as a flame retardant in various materials including composites. It finds extensive use in electronic applications including printed circuit boards and general packaging for electronic materials.

== Toxicity ==
The toxicity has been studied extensively, and even dusts containing the material have been studied for safer reuse and recovery. The material and its analogs have likewise had their toxicological properties studied. It is used as a control in studies evaluating the use of non-halogenated flame retardants.
