= Dinitrobisphenol A =

Names
- Preferred IUPAC name 4,4′-(Propane-2,2-diyl)bis(2-nitrophenol)
- Other names 3,3'-Dinitro-bisphenol A; Dinitro-bisphenol A; 2,2-Bis(4-hydroxy-3-nitrophenyl)propane; 4-[2-(4-Hydroxy-3-nitrophenyl)propan-2-yl]-2-nitrophenol

Identifiers
CAS Number	5329-21-5
3D model (JSmol)	Interactive image
ChEMBL	ChEMBL1704162
ChemSpider	190706
PubChem CID	219958
UNII	SUB3DJ24JL
CompTox Dashboard (EPA)	DTXSID40277355
- InChI: InChI=1S/C15H14N2O6/c1-15(2,9-3-5-13(18)11(7-9)16(20)21)10-4-6-14(19)12(8-10)17(22)23/h3-8,18-19H,1-2H3 Key: LISYARSNTHASDG-UHFFFAOYSA-N
- SMILES: CC(C)(C1=CC(=C(C=C1)O)[N+](=O)[O-])C2=CC(=C(C=C2)O)[N+](=O)[O-]

Properties
Chemical formula	C_{15}H_{14}N_{2}O_{6}
Molar mass	318.285 g·mol^{−1}
Appearance	Yellow powder
Melting point	130 °C (266 °F; 403 K)
- Except where otherwise noted, data are given for materials in their standard state (at 25 °C [77 °F], 100 kPa). Infobox references

3,3'-Dinitrobisphenol A is an organic compound with the formula (HO(O_{2}N)C_{6}H_{3})_{2}C(CH_{3})_{2}. It is a yellow-orange solid prepared by nitration of bisphenol A.

== Carcinogenicity ==
It has been proposed that 3,3'-dinitrobisphenol A might be formed in vivo by peroxynitrite-mediated oxidations of bisphenol A and that it may exhibit higher toxicity than BPA itself. 3,3'-Dinitrobisphenol A has been found to be genotoxic in male ICR mice on a micronucleus test. Its estrogenic potential is not known, but it has shown some binding to estrogen-related receptor gamma to an extent.

== See also ==
- Bisphenol A
- Tetrabromobisphenol A
