= Thermal paper =

Paper treated to change colour with heat

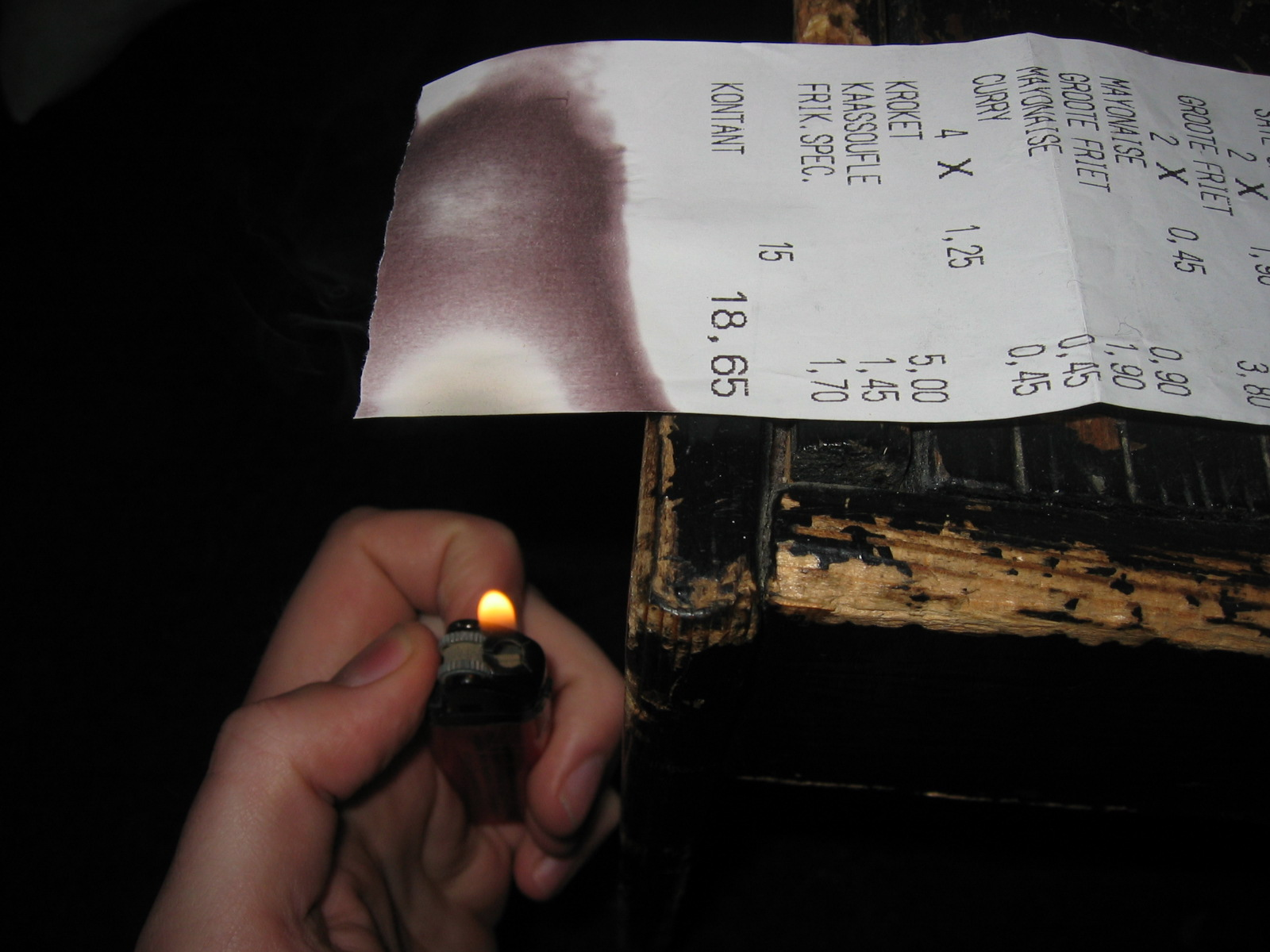
A receipt printed on thermal paper. A heat source near the paper will color the paper.

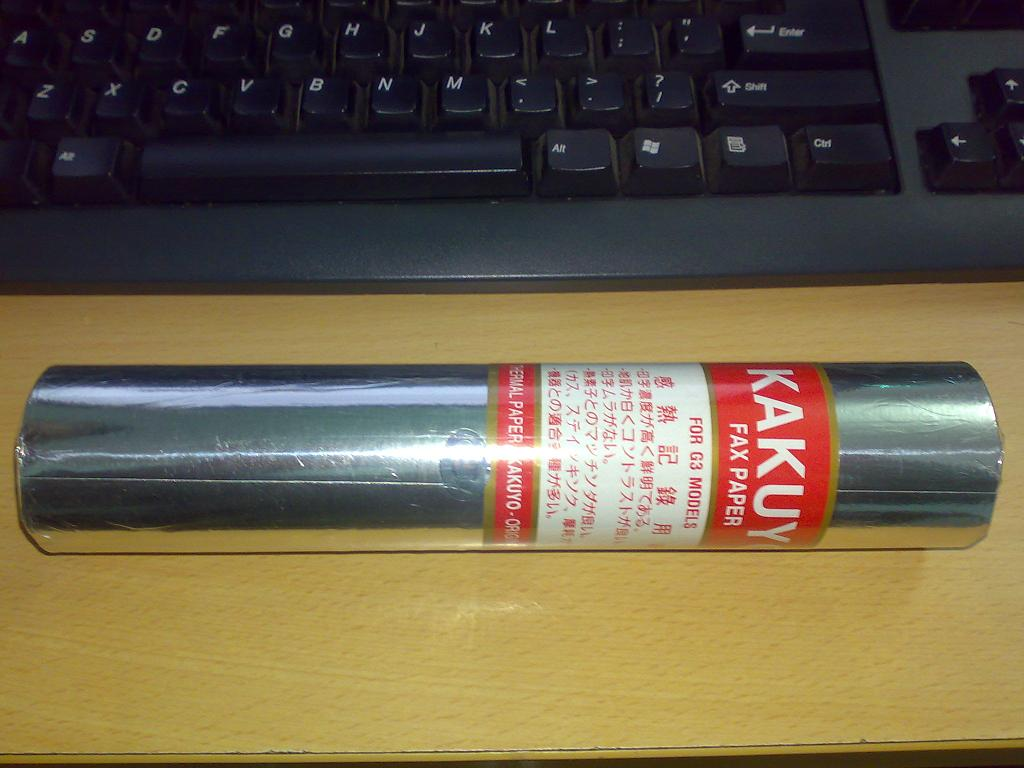
Paper roll for thermal fax machine

Thermal paper (often supplied in roll form, and sometimes referred to as an audit roll) is a special fine paper that is coated with a material formulated to change color locally when exposed to heat. It is used in thermal printers, particularly in inexpensive devices, such as adding machines, cash registers, credit card terminals and small, lightweight portable printers.

The surface of the paper is coated with a substance which changes color when heated above a certain temperature. The printer essentially consists of a transport mechanism which drags the paper across a thermal dot matrix print head. The (very small) dots of the head heat up very quickly to imprint a dot, then cool equally quickly.

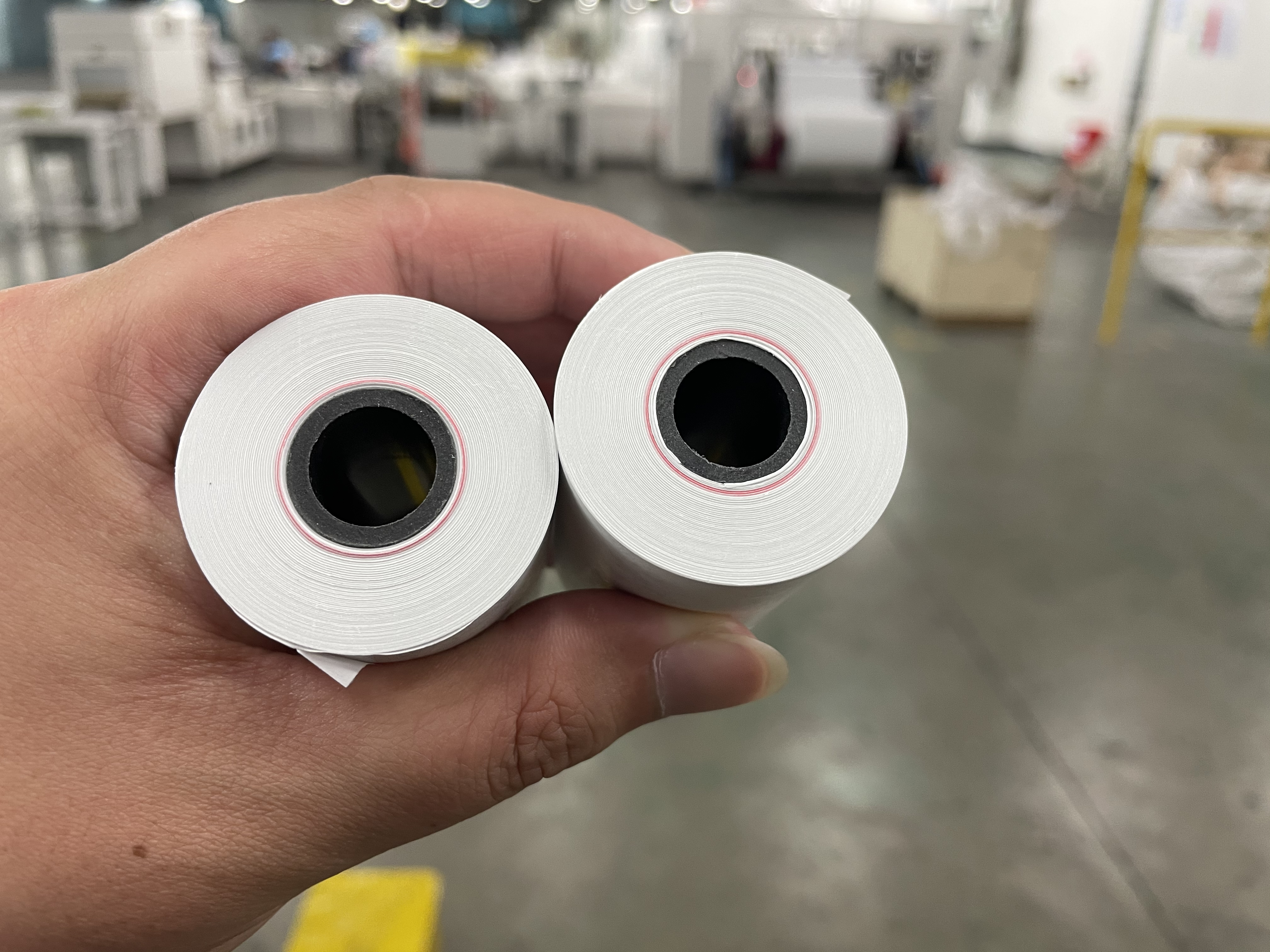
The picture shows two thermal paper rolls with red alert lines to remind the merchant to replace the roll.

Most thermal papers' coatings turn black when heated, but coatings that turn blue or red, and multicolor coatings, are sometimes used. An unintended heat source, such as a coffee cup, can discolour the paper and obscure any printing. A fingernail rubbed quickly across the paper may generate enough heat from friction to produce a mark.

== History ==
The earliest direct thermal papers were developed by NCR Corporation (using dye chemistry) and 3M (using metallic salts). The NCR technology became the market leader over time, although the image would fade rather rapidly compared with the much more expensive, but durable 3M technology.

Texas Instruments invented the thermal print head in 1965, and the Silent 700, a computer terminal with a thermal printer, was released in the market in 1969. The Silent 700 was the first thermal print system that printed on thermal paper. During the 1970s, Hewlett-Packard integrated thermal paper printers into the design of its HP 9800 series desktop computers, and integrated it into the top of the 2600-series CRT terminals as well as in plotters.

In the 1970s and early 1980s, Japanese producers, including Ricoh, Jujo, and Kanzaki, using similar dye-based chemistry, formed partnerships with barcode printer manufacturers, including TEC and Sato, and entered the emerging global bar code industry, primarily for supermarket receipt printers. U.S. producers including Appleton (NCR's license), Nashua Corporation, and Graphic Controls fought for market share. Users of pressure-sensitive label such as those made by Avery Dennison became major consumers of direct thermal label stock.

In the late 1980s and early 1990s, thermal transfer (distinct from direct thermal, and stable), laser printing, electrophotography, and, to a lesser extent, inkjet printing began to take away industrial and warehouse barcode applications due to better stability and durability of prints. Direct thermal made a strong comeback with point-of-sale receipt printing.

== Consumer and artistic uses ==
During 1998, Nintendo used thermal paper technology for their Game Boy Printer.

Thermal paper has also been used in standalone instant print cameras as an alternative to instant film cameras, and in artistic practice, where the medium's association with receipts and tendency to fade over time has been used to create photographic works.

== Mechanism of action ==
The printer essentially consists of a transport mechanism which drags the paper across a thermal dot matrix print head. The (very small) dots of the head heat up very quickly to imprint a dot, then cool equally quickly.

== Chemistry ==
Four different types of imaging chemicals are used in thermally sensitive papers: leuco dyes, developers, sensitizers and stabilizers.

Leuco dyes
The leuco dyes used in direct thermal paper are usually triaryl methane phthalide dyes, such as Yamamoto Blue 4450, or fluoran dyes, such as Pergascript Black 2C. A third widely used leuco dye is Crystal violet lactone. Red or magenta color can be achieved with dyes such as Yamamoto Red 40. Yellow can be produced by the protonation of a triaryl pyridine, such as Copikem Yellow 37. These dyes have a colorless leuco form when crystalline or when in a pH neutral environment, but become colored when dissolved in a melt and exposed to an acidic environment.
Developers
Leuco dyes, in general, provide little color when melted unless they are melted in conjunction with one or more organic acids. Examples of organic acids suitable for thermochromic papers are phenols such as Bisphenol A (BPA) and Bisphenol S (BPS). Other suitable acidic materials are sulfonyl ureas such as BTUM and Pergafast 201. Zinc salts of substituted salicylic acids, such as zinc di-tert-butylsalicylate have also been commercially used as developers .
Sensitizers
A leuco dye and a developer, when melted together, are enough to produce color. However, the thermal threshold of the coated layer containing the colorizing components is determined by the lowest melting component of the layer. Furthermore, developers and leuco dyes often mix poorly upon melting. To optimize the colorization temperature and to facilitate mixing, a third chemical called a sensitizer is commonly added to the imaging layer. Sensitizers are commonly simple ether molecules such as 1,2-bis-(3-methylphenoxy)ethane or 2-benzyloxynapthalene. These two materials melt at approximately 100 °C, which is a practical lower limit for thermal coloration. These low-cost ethers are excellent low viscosity solvents for leuco dyes and developers, and this facilitates color formation at a well-defined temperature and with minimum energy input.
Stabilizers
Dyes in thermally sensitive paper are often unstable and return to their original colorless, crystalline forms when stored in hot or humid conditions. To stabilize the metastable glass formed by the leuco dye, developer and sensitizer, a fourth type of material called a stabilizer is often added to thermal papers. Stabilizers often share similarities with developers and are often complex multifunctional phenols that inhibit recrystallization of the dye and developer, thereby stabilizing the printed image.

== Paper stock ==
Papers are supplied either as rolls or (particularly for wider letter-size printers) sheets. They may have a stick-and-peel adhesive backing, for use as labels and similar purposes. Paper may be white, other colors, or transparent.

In 2006, NCR Corporation's Systemedia division introduced two-sided thermal printing technology, called "2ST".

=== Protective coating ===
Most direct thermal papers require a protective top-coating to:

- reduce fading of the thermal image caused by exposure to UV light, water, oils and fats, plasticizers, and other causes
- reduce print-head wear
- reduce or eliminate residue from the thermal coating on the thermal print heads
- provide better anchorage of flexographic printing inks applied to the thermal paper
- focus the heat from the thermal print head on the active coating.

=== Multicolored papers ===
Multicolor thermal paper first became available in 1993 with the introduction of the Fuji Thermo-Autochrome (TA) system.

This was followed in 2007 by Polaroid's development of the Zink ("zero-ink") system. Both of these methods rely on multi-layer coatings with three separate colorizing layers, with different methods used for independent activation of each layer. The paper is used in compact photo printers. It has several layers: a backing layer with optional pressure sensitive adhesive, heat-sensitive layers with cyan, magenta and yellow pigments in colorless form, and overcoat. Zink technology allows the printing of full-color images in a single pass without requiring ink cartridges. The color addressing is achieved by controlling the heat pulse length and intensity. The color-forming layers contain colorless crystals of amorphochromic dyes. These dyes form microcrystals of their colorless tautomers, which convert to the colored form by melting and retain color after resolidification. The yellow layer is the topmost one, sensitive to short heat pulses of high temperature. The magenta layer is in the middle, sensitive to longer pulses of moderate temperature. The cyan layer is at the bottom, sensitive to long pulses of low temperature. The layers are separated by thin interlayers, acting as heat insulation, moderating the heat throughput.

== Health and environmental concerns ==
Some thermal papers are coated with BPA, a chemical considered to be an endocrine disruptor. This material can contaminate recycled paper. BPA can transfer readily to the skin in small amounts:

When taking hold of a receipt consisting of thermal printing paper for five seconds, roughly 1 μg BPA (0.2–0.6 μg) was transferred to the forefinger and the middle finger if the skin was rather dry, and about ten times more than this if these fingers were wet or very greasy. Exposure to a person who repeatedly touches thermal printer paper for about ten hours per day, such as at a cash register, could reach 71 micrograms per day, which is 42 times less than the present tolerable daily intake (TDI).

The chemical bisphenol A (BPA) is used for thermal paper coatings because of its stability and heat-resistance. This allows inkless printing for receipts from cash registers. People who often are in contact with BPA coated receipts do have a higher level of BPA in their bodies than people with average contact. Therefore, the New York Suffolk County signed a resolution to ban BPA in thermal receipt papers. Violation of this new law, the "Safer Sales Slip Act", involves a US$500 penalty. The law became effective beginning January 3, 2014.

From about 2013 bisphenol S (BPS), an analog of BPA that has been shown to have similar in vitro estrogenic activity to BPA, has been used in thermal paper coatings. The recycling of thermal paper coated with BPS can introduce BPS into the cycle of paper production and cause BPS contamination of other types of paper products. Newer formulations are available which use either urea-based compounds or vitamin C, and are "phenol free". They can have comparable or even improved print quality, but cost more.
