= Engineering plastic =

Plastics often used for making mechanical parts

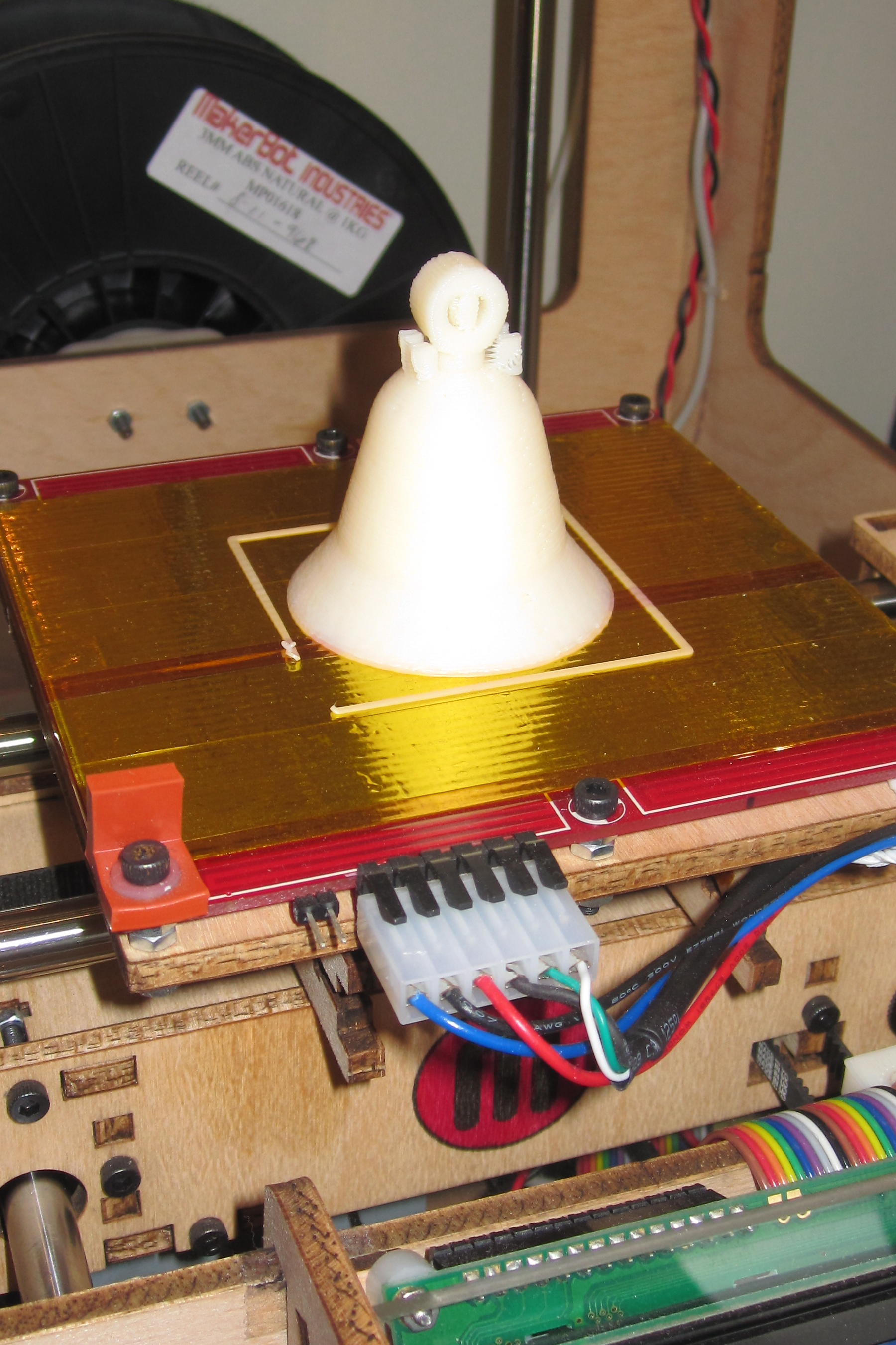
An ABS bell manufactured with a 3D printer

Engineering plastics are a group of plastic materials that have better mechanical or thermal properties than the more widely used commodity plastics (such as polystyrene, polyvinyl chloride, polypropylene and polyethylene).

Engineering plastics are more expensive than standard plastics, therefore they are produced in lower quantities and tend to be used for smaller objects or low-volume applications (such as mechanical parts), rather than for bulk and high-volume ends (like containers and packaging). Engineering plastics have a higher heat resistance than standard plastics and are continuously usable at temperatures up to about 150 °C (300 °F).

The term usually refers to thermoplastic materials rather than thermosetting ones. Examples of engineering plastics include polyamides (PA, nylons), used for skis and ski boots; polycarbonates (PC), used in motorcycle helmets and optical discs; and poly(methyl methacrylate) (PMMA, major brand names acrylic glass and plexiglass), used e.g. for taillights and protective shields. The currently most-consumed engineering plastic is acrylonitrile butadiene styrene (ABS), used for e.g. car bumpers, dashboard trim and Lego bricks.

Engineering plastics have gradually replaced traditional engineering materials such as metal, glass or ceramics in many applications. Besides equalling or surpassing them in strength, weight, and other properties, engineering plastics are much easier to manufacture, especially in complicated shapes. Across all different product types, more than 22 million tonnes of engineering plastics were consumed worldwide in 2020.

== Relevant properties ==
Each engineering plastic usually has a unique combination of properties that may make it the material of choice for some application. For example, polycarbonates are highly resistant to impact, while polyamides are highly resistant to abrasion. Other properties exhibited by various grades of engineering plastics include heat resistance, mechanical strength, rigidity, chemical stability, self lubrication (specially used in manufacturing of gears and skids) and fire safety.

== Examples ==
A comparison of standard plastics, engineering plastics, and high-performance plastics

- Acrylonitrile butadiene styrene
- Nylon 6
- Nylon 6-6
- Polyamides
- Polybutylene terephthalate
- Polycarbonates
- Polyetheretherketone
- Polyetherimide
- Polyetherketoneketone
- Polyetherketones
- Polyketone
- Polyethylene terephthalate
- Polyimides
- Polyoxymethylene plastic (acetal)
- Polyphenylene sulfide
- Polyphenylene oxide
- Polysulphone
- Polytetrafluoroethylene (Teflon)
- Poly(methyl methacrylate)

== Market and economic landscape ==
The market for engineering plastics is rapidly expanding across the globe due to a shift from traditional materials like metals and alloys to high-performance polymers with superior mechanical, thermal and chemical properties. The market size in 2024 was 146.80 billion USD, with a revenue forecast of 230.64 billion USD for 2030. The market continues to grow in the areas of aerospace, automation & transportation, construction, consumer goods & appliances, electronics, and medical applications. The automation and transportation segment had the largest market share in 2023, totalling 34.85%. Key manufacturers in this competitive market are Grand Pacific Petrochemical Corporation, Mitsubishi Engineering-Plastics Corporation, and Celanese Corp. By resin type, the styrene copolymers ABS and SAN held the largest share at 33.7% in 2023. ABS is a high-demand engineering plastic often used in electronics and automotive parts such as bumpers and interior trims due to its lightweight and durable nature.

== Sustainability and environmental impact ==
Engineering plastics are valued for their superior mechanical properties, including high tensile strength, impact resistance, fatigue endurance, and high melting point, making them suitable for many applications. However, these characteristics result in challenges at the end of the product lifecycle. Compared to traditional materials, many engineering plastics are not easily recyclable. Recycling processes for these materials are often complex and expensive, resulting in materials being disposed in landfills, where they can take hundreds of years to decompose. However, due to the high-performance characteristics of engineering plastics, recycled engineering plastics have superior properties compared to commodity plastics, and with a lower price point than virgin resin, they can serve as the ideal choice for certain industry applications.

The plastics industry has begun pursuing sustainable solutions such as shifting to bio-based materials. One solution involves producing plastic with renewable sources such as plant-based materials instead of fossil fuels. This results in highly biodegradable polymers (also known as bioengineering polymers, biopolymers, or bioplastics) such as polyhydroxyalkanoates (PHA), polylactic acid (PLA), and polybutylene succinate (PBS), which reduce the amount of waste produced over time.

In the automotive industry, the use of advanced plastics enables the production of lighter, more fuel-efficient and environmentally friendly vehicles. The implementation of engineering plastics and lightweight design serves as an opportunity to reduce fuel consumption and greenhouse gas emissions, with the use of bioplastics enabling even greater advances in sustainability. However, in comparison to traditional engineering plastics, bioplastics typically lack the necessary mechanical properties for use the automotive industry, with some exhibiting thermal degradation that results in the emission of undesirable odors or deformation of parts after exposure to heat; however, these plastics can be reinforced by using other polymers to enhance their properties.

== See also ==
- High-performance plastics
- ABS
