= C12H10O2 =

The molecular formula C_{12}H_{10}O_{2} (molar mass: 186.20 g/mol, exact mass: 186.0681 u) may refer to:

- 1-Naphthaleneacetic acid (NAA)
- Biphenol
  - 2,2'-Biphenol
  - 4,4'-Biphenol
