= Valerie Ashby =

African-American polymer chemist

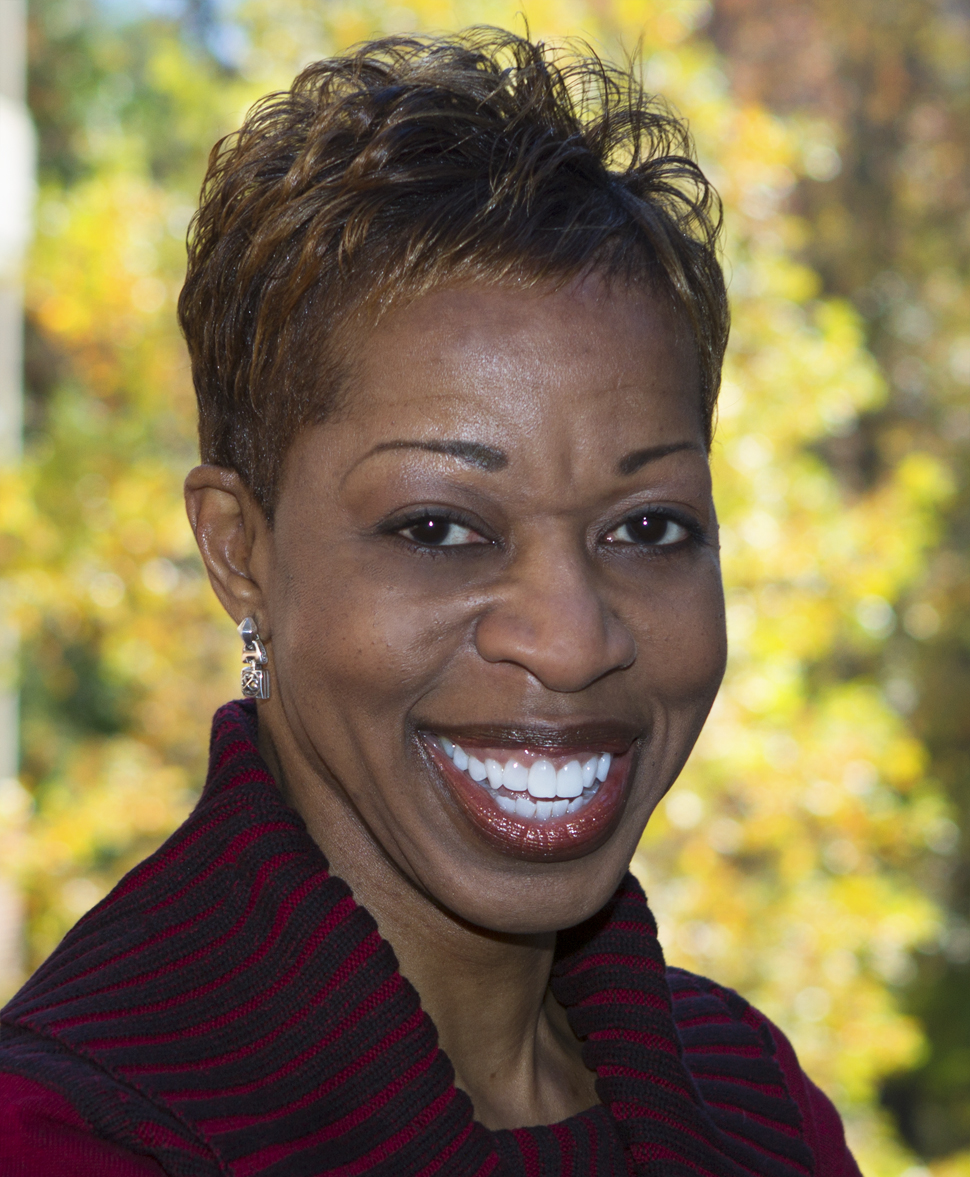

President of the University of Maryland, Baltimore County
- Incumbent
- Assumed office 2022
- Preceded by: Freeman Hrabowski

Personal details
- Born: Valerie Sheares Ashby; September 6, 1966 (age 60) Clayton, North Carolina, US
- Scientific career
- Education: University of North Carolina at Chapel Hill
- Fields: Chemistry
- Workplaces: University of Maryland, Baltimore County; Duke University; University of North Carolina; Iowa State University
- Thesis: Synthesis and Characterization of Thiophene-Based Poly (Arylene Ether Ketones) and Poly (Arylene Ether Sulfones) (1994)
- Doctoral advisor: Joseph DeSimone

Valerie Sheares Ashby is an American chemist and university professor who currently serves as president of the University of Maryland, Baltimore County. She was the Dean of Trinity College of Arts and Sciences at Duke University from 2015 to 2022 and formerly chair of the chemistry department at the University of North Carolina at Chapel Hill from 2012 to 2015. With her research group, she holds ten patents. On April 4, 2022, it was announced that Ashby would assume the position of president of the University of Maryland, Baltimore County.

== Early life and education ==
Ashby was born and grew up in Clayton, North Carolina. She was first introduced to science through her father, who was a high school math and science teacher. Ashby was graduated from the University of North Carolina at Chapel Hill (UNC) with a B.A. in chemistry in 1988. After her graduation, she worked as an agricultural and organic chemist at Rhône-Poulenc, located in the nearby Research Triangle Park.

=== Graduate studies ===
Ashby returned to UNC for graduate studies in 1989, working as a research assistant in the lab of Prof. Joseph DeSimone and completing her thesis, entitled Synthesis and Characterization of Thiophene-Based Poly(Arylene Ether Ketones) and Poly(Arylene Ether Sulfones), in 1994. During her graduate studies, Ashby worked as a visiting scientist at IBM's Almaden Research Center in San Jose, California, in the summer of 1992, where she worked on the synthesis of thiophene-containing polyetherimides. She also spent the summer of 1993 as a visiting scientist at the Eastman Chemical Company in Kingsport, Tennessee, where she examined the role of catalysts in the color body origin in poly(ester amide)s.

=== Postdoctoral studies ===
After graduating with her Ph.D., Ashby worked as a NSF and NATO Postdoctoral Fellow at the Johannes Gutenberg University of Mainz's Institute for Organic Chemistry in Germany. At Mainz, Ashby worked under the direction of Prof. Reimund Stadler on the synthesis of ABC block copolymers.

== Career ==
=== Iowa State University ===
Ashby began her independent academic career at Iowa State University as an assistant professor in 1996, and was promoted to associate professor in 2002. While at Iowa State, Ashby was a mentor for the Iowa State University Program for Women in Science & Engineering, a summer research program for undergraduate and high school students.

=== University of North Carolina – Chapel Hill ===
Ashby spent August 2003 to June 2004 on sabbatical leave at the Massachusetts Institute of Technology under the direction of Prof. Robert Langer. In August 2003, Ashby also began her appointment as associate professor at UNC Chapel Hill. In 2005, Ashby was awarded an NSF grant that aimed to increase the number of underrepresented minorities receiving doctoral degrees in STEM fields. Her work helped to increase the Ph.D. completion rate for underrepresented minorities from about 60% to 85% at UNC. She was appointed Vice Chair of Undergraduate Studies in August 2005. Ashby was granted the rank of full professor and the Bowman and Gordon Gray Distinguished Term Professor of Chemistry in July 2007. In July 2012 she was named chair of the department of chemistry and the faculty director of the UNC Chapel Hill Graduate School Initiative for Minority Excellence (IME) in July 2014.

Through her career, Ashby has accumulated numerous awards, including the National Science Foundation Career Development Award, the DuPont Young Faculty Award, the 3M Young Faculty Award, the UNC Chapel Hill General Alumni Association Faculty Service Award, the J. Carlyle Sitterson Freshman Teaching Award, the UNC Student Undergraduate Teaching Award, the Johnston Teaching Award for Undergraduate Teaching, and the 2008 Outstanding Faculty Staff Award.

=== Duke University ===
On May 7, 2015, Duke University President Richard H. Brodhead and Provost Sally Kornbluth announced that Ashby would be the next dean of Trinity College of Arts & Sciences at Duke University succeeding Laurie Patton, who became the new president of Middlebury. The search committee that nominated and unanimously supported Ashby consisted of faculty members, students, administrators and trustees.

=== University of Maryland, Baltimore County ===
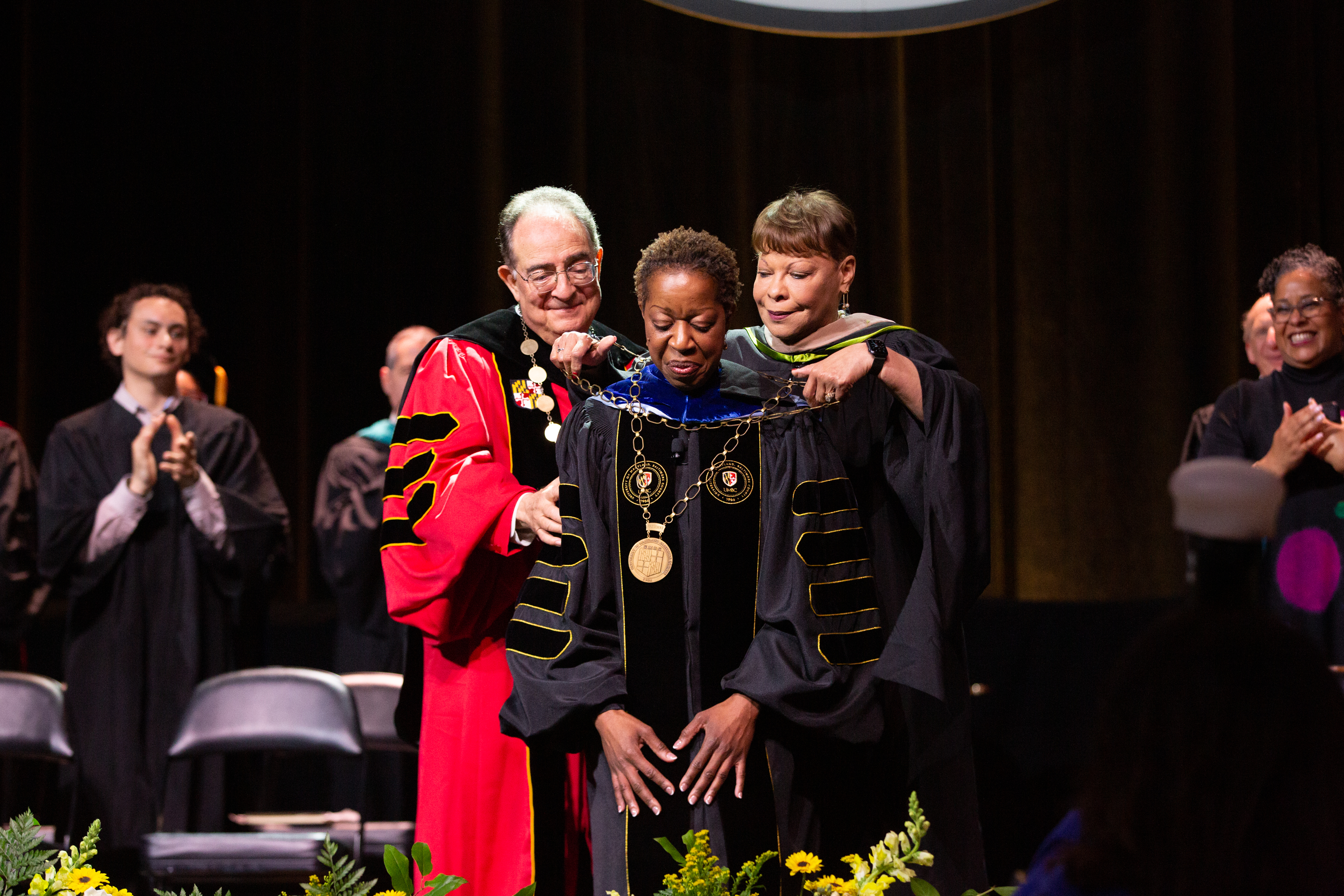
Ashby being sworn in as UMBC president, 2023

On Monday, April 4, 2022, outgoing UMBC President Freeman Hrabowski announced that Ashby would be the next President of UMBC, effective August 1, 2022. Ashby also holds a faculty appointment in UMBC's Department of Chemistry and Biochemistry.

== List of patents ==
- "Shape Memory Materials and Biomaterials with Fabrication of Nanoscopic and Microscopic Features", Patent filed, 5/14.
- "Iodinated Polymers for CT Contrast Agents", Patent filed 8/14.
- "Polyester Based Degradable Materials and Implantable Biomedical Articles Formed Therefrom", issued 9/6/11, U.S. Patent No. 8,013,061
- "pH-Sensitive Methacrylic Copolymers and the Production Thereof", issued 1/07, U.S. Patent Number 7,160,971.
- "Functionalized Diene Monomers and Polymers Containing Functionalized Dienes and Methods for Their Preparation", Continuation issued 6/03, Patent No. 6,583,260
- "Functionalized Diene Monomers and Polymers Containing Functionalized Dienes and Methods for Their Preparation", Continuation Issued 2/02, Patent No. 6,344,538
- "Functionalized Diene Monomers and Polymers Containing Functionalized Dienes and Methods for Their Preparation", Issued 8/00, Patent No. 6,100,373
- "High Performance Fluorinated Polymers and Methods", Issued 2/03, Patent No. 6,515,101
- "Polyester Based Degradable Materials and Implantable Biomedical Articles Formed Therefrom", Issued 2/13, Patent No. 8,383,725
