= Benzone =

Benzone may refer to:

- Phenylbutazone (a drug for which Benzone is a trade name)
- Benzophenone-n, a class of compounds derived from benzophenone, including
  - Oxybenzone
  - Dioxybenzone

and mostly used in sunscreens
