= Polyetherketones =

Polyetherketones (PEK for short) are polymers whose molecular backbone contain alternating ketone (R-CO-R) and Ether (R-O-R) functionalities. The most common are Polyaryletherketones (PAEK), in which there is an aryl group linked in the (1–4)-position between each of the functional groups. The backbone, which is thus very rigid, gives the materials very high glass transition and melting temperatures compared to other plastics.

== Synthesis ==
Polyetherketones can be obtained by condensation of 4,4′-difluorobenzophenone and potassium or sodium salt of hydroquinone:

== Types ==
The most common of these high-temperature resistant materials is polyetheretherketone (PEEK).

Other types of polyetherketone are:

- PEKK = Polyetherketoneketone
- PEEKK = Polyether ether ketone ketone
- PEKEKK = Polyetherketoneetherketoneketone

== Applications ==
Space and aviation: aircraft parts (fins, wing flaps, nose caps, seats). Replacements for metal parts, also in the military field.

Machinery and automotive industry: high-performance molded parts such as bearing cages, gears, sealing rings, valve spring retainers, impellers. Coatings when high resistance to temperatures above 200 °C is required. Coatings made of PEEK or PEK, for example, are suitable for applications up to 230 °C (450 °F).

Electronics industry: wire and cable sheathing, flexible printed circuit boards, semiconductor production, offshore connectors.

Medical technology: endoscope handles, hip joint prostheses. Because polyetherketones can be sterilized without damaging them, PEK is often used for surgical applications.

== Properties ==
PEK has a high temperature resistance. It is also characterized by high wear resistance. In addition, polyetherketones are highly resistant to chemicals: They are resistant to non-oxidizing acids, grease, lubricants, water vapor, hot water, and concentrated alkalis.

== Literature ==
- Beland, S. (1990). High performance thermoplastic resins and their composites. William Andrew.
- Díez-Pascual, A. M., Naffakh, M., Marco, C., Ellis, G., & Gómez-Fatou, M. A. (2012). High-performance nanocomposites based on polyetherketones. Progress in Materials Science, 57(7), 1106–1190.
