= High-performance plastics =

Plastics that meet higher requirements than engineering plastics

A comparison of standard plastics, engineering plastics, and high-performance plastics

High-performance plastics are plastics that meet higher requirements than standard (commodity) or engineering plastics. They are more expensive and used in smaller amounts.

== Definition ==
High performance plastics differ from standard plastics and engineering plastics primarily by their temperature stability, but also by their chemical resistance and mechanical properties, production quantity, and price.

There are many synonyms for the term high-performance plastics, such as: high temperature plastics, high-performance polymers, high performance thermoplastics or high-tech plastics. The name high temperature plastics is in use due to their continuous service temperature (CST), which is always higher than 150 °C by definition (although this is not their only feature, as it can be seen above).

The term "polymers" is often used instead of "plastics" because both terms are used as synonyms in the field of engineering.

However, the differentiation from less powerful plastics has varied over time; while nylon and poly(ethylene terephthalate) were initially considered powerful plastics, they are now ordinary.

== History ==
The improvement of mechanical properties and thermal stability is and has always been an important goal in the research of new plastics. Since the early 1960s, the development of high-performance plastics has been driven by corresponding needs in the aerospace and nuclear technology. Synthetic routes for example for PPS, PES and PSU were developed in the 1960s by Philips, ICI and Union Carbide. The market entry took place in the early 70s. A production of PEEK (ICI), PEK (ICI) and PEI (General Electric) via polycondensation was developed in the 1970s. PEK was offered since 1972 by Raychem, however, made by an electrophilic synthesis. Since electrophilic synthesis has in general the disadvantage of a low selectivity to linear polymers and is using aggressive reactants, the product could hold only a short time on the market. For this reason, the majority of high-performance plastics is nowadays produced by polycondensation processes.

In manufacturing processes by polycondensation a high purity of the starting materials is important. In addition, the stereochemistry plays a role in achieving the desired properties in general. The development of new high-performance plastics is therefore closely linked to the development and economic production of the constituent monomers.

== Characteristics ==
High performance plastics meet higher requirements than standard and engineering plastics because of their more desirable mechanical properties, higher chemical and/or a higher heat stability. Especially the latter makes processing difficult, often requiring specialized machinery. Most high-performance plastics are exploited for a single property (e.g. heat stability), in contrast to engineering plastics which provide moderate performance over a wider range of properties. Some of their diverse applications include: fluid flow tubing, electrical wire insulators, architecture, and fiber optics.

High performance plastics are relatively expensive: The price per kilogram may be between $5 (PA 46) and $100 (PEEK). The average value is slightly less than 15 US-Dollar/kg. High-performance plastics are thus about 3 to 20 times as expensive as engineering plastics. In the future, a significant price decline cannot be expected, since the investment costs for production equipment, the time-consuming development, and the high distribution costs are going to remain constant.

Since production volumes are very limited with 20.000 t/year the high-performance plastics are holding a market share of just about 1%.

Among the high-performance polymers, fluoropolymers have 45% market share (main representatives: PTFE), sulfur-containing aromatic polymers 20% market share (mainly PPS), aromatic polyarylether and Polyketones 10% market share (mainly PEEK) and liquid crystal polymers (LCP) 6%. The two largest consumers of high-performance plastics are the electrical and electronics industries (41%) and the automotive industry (24%). All remaining industries (including chemical industry) have a share of 23%.

=== Thermal stability ===
Thermal stability is a key feature of high-performance plastics. Also mechanical properties are closely linked to the thermal stability.

Based on the properties of the standard plastics some improvements of mechanical and thermal features can already be accomplished by addition of stabilizers or reinforcing materials (glass and carbon fibers, for example) or by an increase in the degree of polymerization. Further improvements can be achieved through substitution of aliphatic by aromatic units. Operating temperatures up to 130 °C are reached in this way. Thermosets (which do not belong to the high-performance plastics, see above) have a similar temperature stability with up to 150 °C. An even higher service temperature can be reached by linking of aromatics (e.g. phenyl) with oxygen (as diphenyl ether group e. g. PEEK), sulfur (as diphenyl sulfone groups in PES or diphenyl group, for example in PPS) or nitrogen (imide group in PEI or PAI). Resulting operating temperatures might be between 200 °C in the case of PES to 260 °C in case of PEI or PAI.

The increase in temperature stability by incorporating aromatic units is due to the fact, that the temperature stability of a polymer is determined by its resistance against thermal degradation and its oxidation resistance. The thermal degradation occurs primarily by a statistical chain scission; depolymerization and removal of low molecular weight compounds are playing only a minor role.

The thermal-oxidative degradation of a polymer starts at lower temperatures than the merely thermal degradation. Both types of degradation proceed via a radical mechanism. Aromatics offer a good protection against both types of degradation, because free radicals can be delocalized through the π-system of the aromatic and stabilized. In this way the thermal stability is strongly increasing. Poly(p-phenylene) can serve as an example, it consists exclusively of aromatics and provides extremely stability, even at temperatures above 500 °C. On the other hand the rigidity of the chains makes it more or less inprocessible. To find a balance between processability and stability, flexible units can be incorporated into the chain (e.g., O, S, C(CH_{3}). Aromatics can also be substituted by other rather rigid units (e. g. SO_{2}, CO). By mixing these different elements the diversity of high-performance plastics is created with their different characteristics.

In practice a maximum temperature resistance (about 260 °C) can be obtained with fluoropolymers (polymers, in which the hydrogen atoms of the hydrocarbons have been replaced by fluorine atoms). Among them, PTFE has the largest market share with 65–70%. Fluorine-containing polymers are, however, not suitable to serve as construction material due to poor mechanical properties (low strength and stiffness, strong creep under load).

=== Crystallinity ===
High-performance plastics can be divided in amorphous and semi-crystalline polymers, just like all polymers. Polysulfone (PSU), poly(ethersulfone) (PES) and polyetherimide (PEI) for example are amorphous; poly(phenylene sulfide) (PPS), polyetheretherketone (PEEK) and polyether ketones (PEK), however are semi-crystalline.

Crystalline polymers (especially those reinforced with fillers) can be used even above their glass transition temperature. This is because semi-crystalline polymers have, in addition to a glass temperature T_{g}, a crystallite melting point T_{m}, which is usually much higher. For example PEEK possesses a T_{g} of 143 °C but remains usable up to 250 °C (continuous service temperature = 250 °C). Another advantage of semi-crystalline polymers is their high resistance against chemical substances: PEEK possesses a high resistance against aqueous acids, alkalis and organic solvents.
