= Benzophenone-n =

Class of chemical compounds

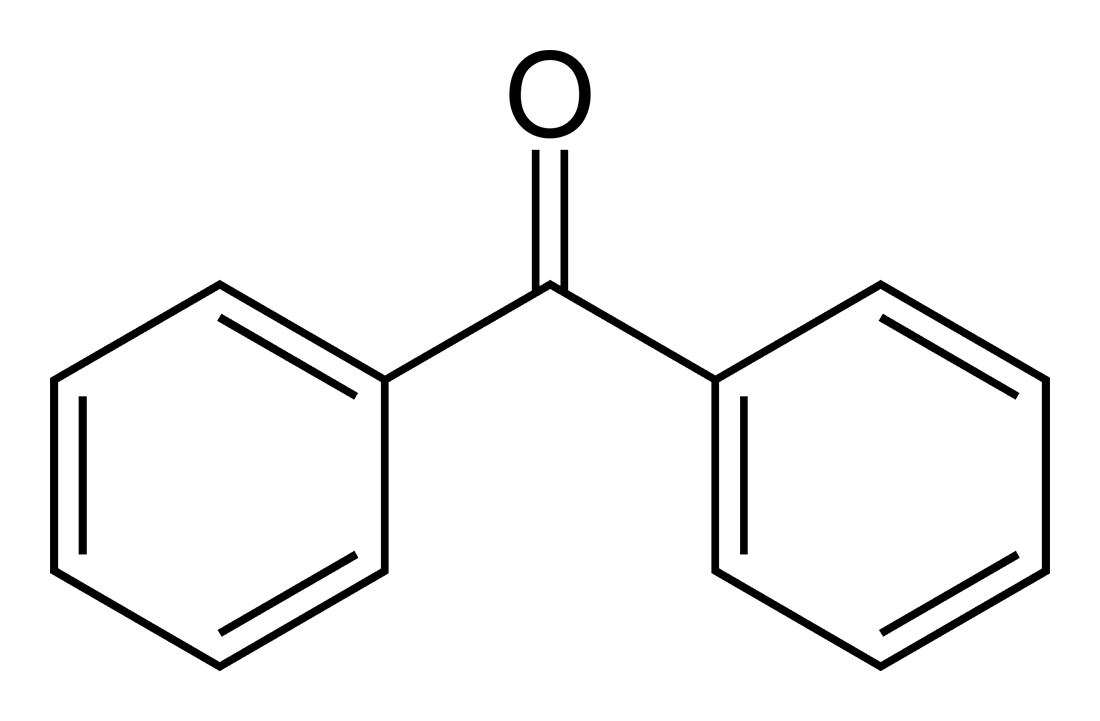
Benzophenone, the base structure of these sunscreening agents

Benzphenone-1 – benzophenone-12 (BP-1 –BP-12) are UVA/UVB absorbers. Some of them are used in sunscreens.

Benzophenone-3 (oxybenzone)

Benzophenone-4 (sulisobenzone)

Benzophenone-5 (sulisobenzone sodium)

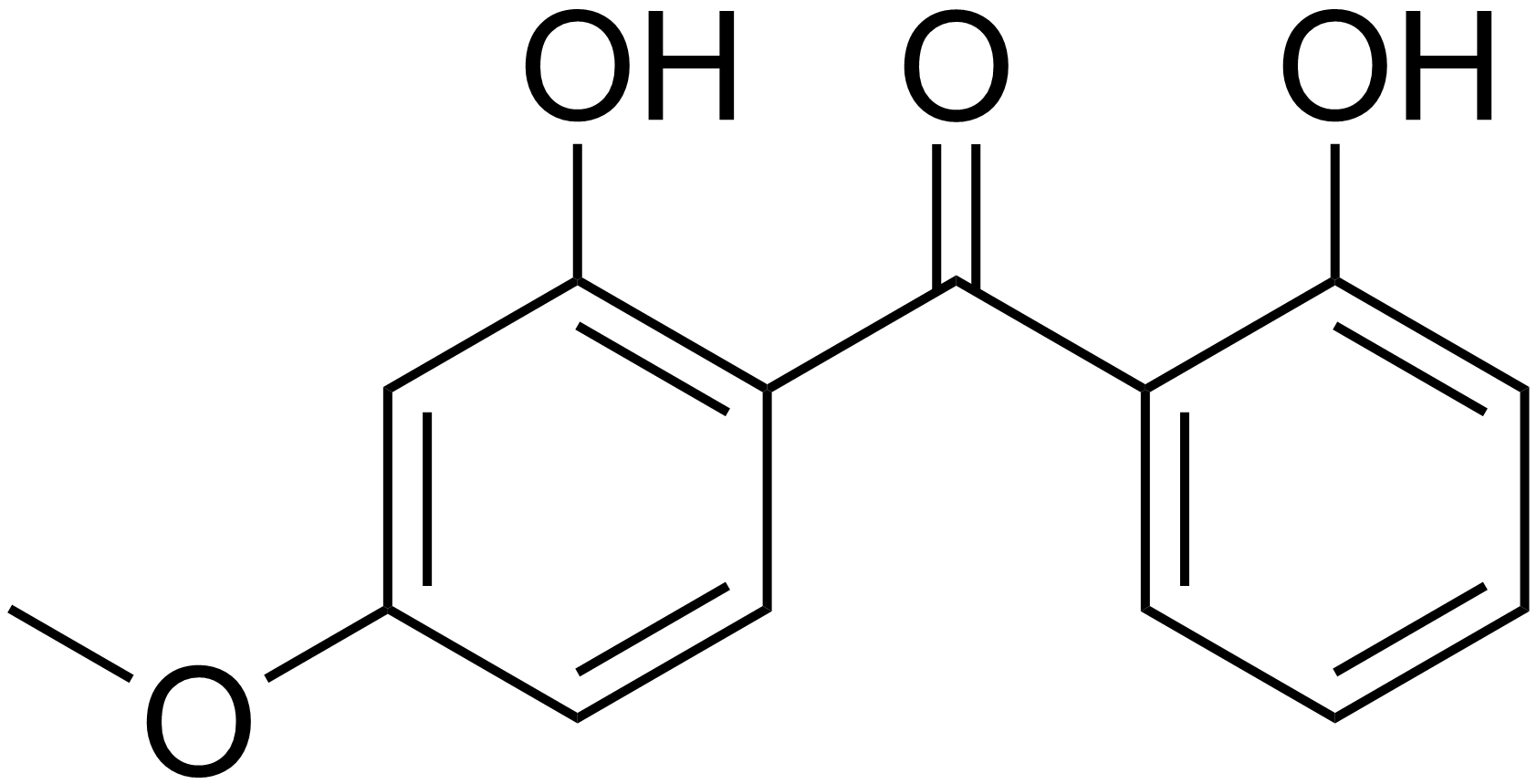
Benzophenone-8 (dioxybenzone)

Benzophenone-10 (mexenone, 2-hydroxy-4-methoxy-4'-methyl-benzophenone)

Benzophenone-12 (octabenzone, used to protect plastics)
- Benzophenone-1 (2,4-dihydroxybenzophenone)
- Benzophenone-2 (2,2',4,4'-tetrahydroxybenzophenone)
- Benzophenone-6 (2,2'-dihydroxy-4,4'-dimethoxybenzophenone)
- Benzophenone-7 (5-chloro-2-hydroxybenzophenone)
- Benzophenone-9 (sodium 2,2'-dihydroxy-4,4'-dimethoxybenzophenone-5,5'-disulfonate)
- Benzophenone-11 (benzophenone-2 and benzophenone-6)
