= Mexenone =

Names
- Preferred IUPAC name (2-Hydroxy-4-methoxyphenyl)(4-methylphenyl)methanone
- Other names Uvistat; Benzophenone-10

Identifiers
CAS Number	1641-17-4
3D model (JSmol)	Interactive image
ChemSpider	64706
ECHA InfoCard	100.015.172
PubChem CID	71645
UNII	ET1UGF4A0B
CompTox Dashboard (EPA)	DTXSID8046242
- InChI: InChI=1S/C15H14O3/c1-10-3-5-11(6-4-10)15(17)13-8-7-12(18-2)9-14(13)16/h3-9,16H,1-2H3 Key: MJVGBKJNTFCUJM-UHFFFAOYSA-N; InChI=1/C15H14O3/c1-10-3-5-11(6-4-10)15(17)13-8-7-12(18-2)9-14(13)16/h3-9,16H,1-2H3 Key: MJVGBKJNTFCUJM-UHFFFAOYAR
- SMILES: CC1=CC=C(C=C1)C(=O)C2=C(C=C(C=C2)OC)O

Properties
Chemical formula	C_{15}H_{14}O_{3}
Molar mass	242.274 g·mol^{−1}
- Except where otherwise noted, data are given for materials in their standard state (at 25 °C [77 °F], 100 kPa). Infobox references

Mexenone (Uvistat, benzophenone-10) is a benzophenone-derived sunscreening agent.

== See also ==
- Benzophenone-n
