= PPSF =

PPSF may refer to:

- Palestinian Popular Struggle Front, a militant Palestinian organisation
- Policía de la Provincia de Santa Fe, an Argentinian police force
- Polyphenylsulfone, a polymer
