= Arkema =

French chemical company

Arkema S.A.
- Type: Public
- Traded as: Euronext Paris: AKE; CAC Next 20 Component
- ISIN: FR0010313833
- Industry: Chemical
- Founded: 2004; 22 years ago
- Headquarters: La Défense, France
- Key people: Thierry Le Hénaff (chairman and CEO)
- Products: Polyamide 11, Elastomers, PVDF, PEKK, Acrylics, synthetic resins, PVC, polymers, hydrogen peroxide, vinyl compounds, pipes, HCFCs and chlorine compounds
- Revenue: €9.1 billion (2025)
- Net income: €63 million (2025)
- Number of employees: 20,700 (2025)
- Subsidiaries: Bostik, Coatex, PIAM, Sartomer
- Website: www.arkema.com

Arkema S.A. is a publicly listed, multi-national manufacturer of specialty materials, headquartered in La Défense, near Paris, France. It has three specialty materials segments (or divisions); adhesives, advanced materials and coatings. A further segment covers primary materials.

The company was created in 2004, as part of French oil major Total's restructuring of its chemicals business, and floated on the Paris stock exchange in May 2006. Turnover in 2025 was €9.1 billion. Arkema operates in 55 countries and has 20,700 employees, 17 research centers and 154 production plants.

== History ==
Arkema was created when French oil major Total restructured its chemicals business in 2004, but the company's roots go back many years.

=== Origin and evolution ===
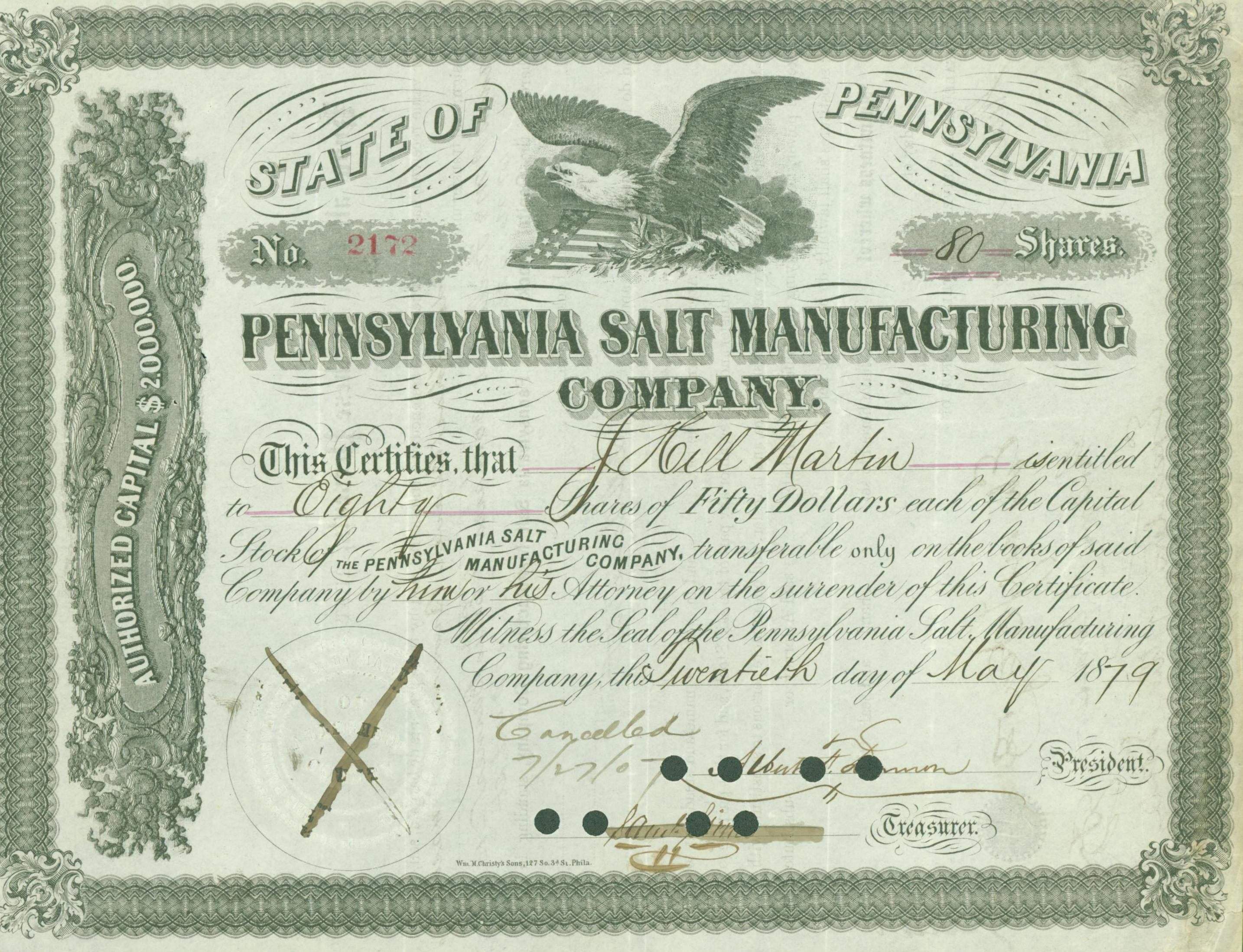
Share of the Pennsylvania Salt Manufacturing Company, issued 20. May 1879

In 1971, Elf and Total merged their chemical operations into Aquitaine Total Organico (ATO), a joint subsidiary. The same year saw the creation of Produits Chimiques Ugine Kuhlmann (PCUK). The joint venture was renamed ATO Chimie in 1973. A second company, Chloé Chimie (40% Elf Aquitaine, 40% Total and 20% Rhône-Poulenc) was formed in 1980 to take over Rhône-Poulenc's chlorochemicals business. Three years later, Total sold its stake in Chloé Chimie to Elf and chemical production in France was reorganized around Atochem, a wholly owned Elf Aquitaine subsidiary that incorporated the activities of ATO Chimie, Chloé Chimie and most of PCUK.

In 1989, Elf Aquitaine acquired the Pennwalt Corporation and, along with M&T Chemicals and Atochem Inc., formed Atochem North America Inc. Pennwalt can trace its roots to the formation of The Pennsylvania Salt Manufacturing Co. by five Philadelphia Quakers in 1850. The Pennsylvania Salt Manufacturing Co. changed its name to Pennsalt Chemicals Corp in 1957 and merged with Wallace and Tiernan Inc. to form Pennwalt Corp in 1969.

The year 1990 saw another reorganization of chemical production in France. Orkem's petrochemicals, styrenics, fertilizers and acrylics businesses were integrated into Atochem, while specialties (resin and paint) moved to Total. Montedison's organic peroxide business was acquired. Atochem was renamed Elf Atochem in 1992 and merged with Total's chemical businesses into Atofina a year after the takeover of Elf by TotalFina in 1999.

=== Formation, independence and listing ===
In February 2004, Total, the French-based multinational oil conglomerate announced a reorganisation of its chemicals business. A new company under Total's ownership, named Arkema, was formed on 1 October into which Total placed certain assets held by its Atofina subsidiary, which was then dissolved. The kem part of Arkema's name references the company as a chemicals producer. Arkema was structured into three divisions producing vinyl products (chlorochemicals and PVC, vinyl compounds and pipes and profiles), industrial chemicals (acrylics, fluorochemicals, hydrogen peroxide, PMMA and thiochemicals) and performance products (additives, organic peroxides, agrochemicals and urea-formaldehyde resins).

Total's intention to spin off Arkema into an independent listed company was achieved on 18 May 2006 when Arkema debuted on the Paris stock market. In June 2011, Arkema joined the CAC Next 20 French stock market index.

=== Acquisitions, disposals and reconfigurations ===
2007: Arkema sells its agrochemical business (Cerexagri) to United Phosphorus and its urea-formaldehyde activities to Hexion.

2007: Acquires Coatex company (specialty acrylic polymers)

2010: Acquires acrylic Dow assets in the US

2011: Acquires Total coating resins (Cray Valley and Sartomer)

2012: acquires Chinese Company Hipro Polymers (producer of bio-Polyamides) and Casda Biomaterials (producer of plant raw materials)

In July 2012, Arkema sold for 1 symbolic euro its vinyl products business segment to the Klesch group for reasons of profitability, but also to re-center its operations exclusively on specialty chemicals. As part of this divestment, Arkema made a 100 million euro cash payment to the Klesch group and took on debts amounting to 470 million euros to help revive the activity. In response to fears of redundancy and to protests from employees at a number of production sites, the trade unions negotiated, with the Arkema management, industrial and social guarantees as well as support measures designed to protect the rights of employees should the Klesch group implement redundancies following their take-over of the vinyl products activities. Hence two trust funds of €20 M were set up to secure compensation payments and the rights of employees of the companies that were sold off. Following the sale, Arkema reorganized its activities into three business segments: High Performance Materials, Industrial Specialties and Coating Solutions. Each represented about one third of Group turnover.

2015 : Purchase of Bostik from Total S.A. The company also joined CJ Group of South Korea to invest in the manufacture of L-methionine in Malaysia.

2020 : Plexiglas business sold to the American group Trinseo for $1.1 billion.

2021 : Acquisition of Ashland's Performance Adhesives business for $1.65 billion.

2022 : Acquisition of Permoseal, an adhesives producer based in South Africa.

2023 : acquisition of a controlling stake in PI Advanced Materials (PIAM), which makes polyimide films for flexible printed circuit boards and graphite sheets used in mobile devices and electric vehicles.

2024 : acquisition of a majority stake of nearly 78% in Proionic, a start-up business in the production and development of ionic liquids, used in lithium-ion batteries.

2024 : acquisition of Dow’s flexible packaging laminating adhesives business.

2025 : Arkema announced a 17 million euro investment to build a new transparent polyamide plant in Singapore.

== Organization ==
=== Adhesive Solutions ===
Adhesive Solutions (30% of the revenues in 2025), operated primarily through Bostik, produces adhesives, glues and sealants for construction, building renovation, consumer and do-it-yourself markets. The segment also serves industrial applications, including transportation, batteries, packaging, labels, tapes and hygiene. Its activities are organized into the Construction & Consumer and Industrial Assembly business lines.

=== Advanced Materials ===
Advanced Materials (37% of the revenues in 2025) comprises high-performance polymers and performance additives. Its products include specialty polyamides, fluoropolymers, polyimides, fluorospecialties, PEKK, thiochemicals, specialty surfactants, organic peroxides, molecular sieves and hydrogen peroxide. These materials are used in transportation, renewable energy, batteries, electronics, construction, water treatment and consumer goods.

=== Coating Solutions ===
Coating Solutions (17% of the revenues in 2025) comprises coating resins and coating additives for decorative paints, industrial coatings and high-tech applications. Its products are also used in adhesives, superabsorbents, water treatment, energy, 3D printing and electronics. The segment is organized into the Coating Resins and Coating Additives business lines.

=== Primary Materials ===
Primary Materials (15% of the revenues in 2025) was introduced in 2026 and comprises Arkema's global acrylic monomers business, legacy refrigerants, and hydrogen peroxide and some of its derivatives. The segment brings together large-scale industrial activities with a more cyclical earnings profile. The legacy refrigerants business is distinct from Arkema's refrigerant technologies reported within Specialty Materials.

== Subsidiaries ==
- Bostik specializes in adhesives and sealants;
- Coatex produces rheology additives for water-based formulations. Its production sites are located in France (Genay), the Netherlands (Moerdijk), the United States (Chester, South Carolina), Korea (Kunsan), China (Changshu) and Brazil (Araçariguama). Its main brands are Rheocoat, Coadis, Rheocarb, Ecodis, Viscoatex and Coapur.
- PIAM (PI Advanced Materials Co., Ltd.) Is 54.07%-owned. It produces Polyamide-based materials.
- Sartomer produces specialty acrylates for UV curing systems (photo-crosslinking).

== Arkema worldwide ==
=== Locations ===
Arkema operates through industrial facilities in Europe, North America and Asia and marketing subsidiaries in around 55 countries.

Arkema has 154 production facilities worldwide, including 65 in Europe, 44 in North America, 32 in Asia and 13 in the reste of the world.

Arkema has 17 research centers worldwide: 7 in France (Lacq; Serquigny; Cerdato; Carling; Genay; Pierre-Benite; and Verneuil), 5 in North America (including Cary, North Carolina; Wauwatosa, Wisconsin; and King of Prussia, Pennsylvania), 3 in China (including Shanghai and Changshu), 1 in Brazil and 1 in Japan.

Distribution of turnover, activity and manpower by region
North and South America	34% of sales 44 plants
Europe	33% of sales 65 plants
Asia	28% of sales 32 plants
Rest of the world	5% of sales 13 plants

== Research and development ==
In 2025, Arkema spent €284 million on research and development, equivalent to 3.1% of Group sales, and employed 1,800 researchers across its 17 R&D centers.

Its research focuses on materials science, including high-performance polymers, bonding and assembly, and the modification and protection of materials, with applications in sustainable energy and electric mobility, advanced electronics, sustainable lifestyle and goods, efficient buildings and homes, and health and well-being.

== Incidents and legal actions ==
=== Crosby, Texas plant explosion ===
In August 2017, Hurricane Harvey caused the flooding of Arkema's Crosby, Texas plant. Arkema said it would be unable to prevent an explosion at the plant, after refrigeration equipment failed that kept temperature sensitive organic peroxides cold. On August 31, explosions were reported to be coming from the plant. These turned out to be "small container ruptures" of burning organic peroxides. A 1.5 mile evacuation zone was set up around the site.

=== Preformation legacy issues ===
==== EU antitrust breach ====
Total, Elf Aquitaine and Arkema were investigated by the EU Commission for involvement in an illegal supply, sales and pricing cartel in the hydrogen peroxide and sodium perborate markets. The Commission found that Arkema's predecessor companies Atochem and Atofina committed the infractions between May 1995 and December 2000. Arkema was fined €78 million in May 2006 for breaching EU antitrust law.

== Shareholder structure ==
As of 31 December 2025, shareholdings exceeding 5% of Arkema’s share capital included employee share ownership (9.7%), Fonds Stratégique de Participations (7.8%) and Lac1 SLP (7.1%). Public shareholders held 74.8% of the share capital, including individual shareholders (9.0%) and other institutional shareholders (65.8%). Treasury shares represented 0.6% of the share capital.
