= Phosphorochloridite =

In chemistry, phosphorochloridites are a class of organophosphorus compound with the formula (RO)_{2}PCl (R = organic substituent). They are pyramidal in shape, akin to regular phosphites (P(OR)_{3}). They are usually colorless and sensitive toward hydrolysis and, to some extent, oxidation to the corresponding phosphorochloridates ((RO)_{2}P(O)Cl).

== Synthesis and reactions ==
Structure of 2,2'-biphenylene phosphorochloridite.

Phosphorochloridites are produced by partial alcoholysis of phosphorus trichloride, which proceeds stepwise:

PCl_{3} + ROH → HCl + (RO)PCl_{2} (phosphochloridite)
(RO)PCl_{2} + ROH → HCl + (RO)_{2}PCl (phosphodichloridite)
(RO)_{2}PCl + ROH → HCl + (RO)_{3}P (phosphite)

These reactions are readily controlled with aromatic diols, such as binaphthol and 2,2'-biphenol.

Phosphorochloridites are precursors to diphosphite ligands. When combined with rhodium precursors such as Rh(acac)(CO)_{2}, these diphosphite ligands afford catalysts that are used industrially for the hydroformylation of alkenes. it and related ligands have become popular in hydroformylation catalysis.
