= Polyphenylenesulfone =

Class of polymers

Structural formula of the polysulfone PSU.

Structural formula of the polysulfone PES.

Polyphenylenesulfone (PPSF or PPSU) is a high performance polymer made of aromatic rings linked by sulfone (-SO_{2}-) groups.

== Production ==
Several kinds of polysulfones are known, which vary according to the diphenoxy linkers.

- Radel&Duradex PPSU, derived from 4,4'-biphenol and 4,4´-dichlorodiphenyl sulfone through salt formation and polycondensation.
- Victrex, derived from [O_{2}S(C_{6}H_{4}OH)_{2}, see bisphenol S

Compared with PSU, the molecular chain of PPSU does not contain isopropylidene but contains a large amount of biphenyl. Therefore, PPSU has higher heat resistance. However, the ether bond in the molecular chain can still provide a certain degree of flexibility, making it available to be used at a low temperature of -240°C. What’s more, the rigidity of the PPSU molecular chain is much higher than that of the PSU. As a result, with higher melt viscosity is higher and worse melt fluidity it is more difficult to process PPSU.

The primary monomers used to manufacture PPSU are:

Monomer	CAS Number	Molecular formula	Function
4,4'-Dichlorodiphenyl sulfone	80-07-9	C₁₂H₈Cl₂O₂S	Sulfone-containing dihalide monomer
4,4'-Biphenol	92-88-6	C₁₂H₁₀O₂	Aromatic diphenol monomer

== Applications ==
PPSFs are moldable plastic often used in rapid prototyping and rapid manufacturing (direct digital manufacturing) applications. Polyphenylsulfones are heat and chemical-resistant suited for automotive, aerospace, feeding bottle and plumbing applications, Polyphenylsulfone has no melting point, reflecting its amorphous nature, and offers tensile strength up to 55 MPa (8000 psi). Its commercial name is Radel. In plumbing applications, polyphenylsulfone fittings have been found to sometimes form cracks prematurely or to experience failure when improperly installed using non-manufacturer approved installation methods or systems.
