= 2,2'-Biphenylene phosphorochloridite =

2,2′-Biphenylene phosphorochloridite

Names
- Preferred IUPAC name 6-Chloro-6H-dibenzo[d,f][1,3,2]dioxaphosphepine
- Other names 1,1′-Biphenyl-2,2′-diyl phosphorochloridite

Identifiers
CAS Number	16611-68-0
3D model (JSmol)	Interactive image
ChemSpider	532081
EC Number	929-115-2
PubChem CID	612102
CompTox Dashboard (EPA)	DTXSID20884920
- InChI: InChI=1S/C12H8ClO2P/c13-16-14-11-7-3-1-5-9(11)10-6-2-4-8-12(10)15-16/h1-8H Key: RKNWJMHQLOIGIH-UHFFFAOYSA-N
- SMILES: C1=CC=C2C(=C1)C3=CC=CC=C3OP(O2)Cl

Properties
Chemical formula	C_{12}H_{8}ClO_{0}P
Molar mass	218.62 g·mol^{−1}
Appearance	white solid
Melting point	63 °C (145 °F; 336 K)
- Except where otherwise noted, data are given for materials in their standard state (at 25 °C [77 °F], 100 kPa). Infobox references

2,2′-Biphenylene phosphorochloridite is the name for a polycyclic organophosphorus compound with the formula C_{12}H_{8}O_{2}PCl. It is a precursor to diphosphite ligands such as BiPhePhos by reaction with suitable diols. 2,2′-Biphenylene phosphorochloridites, which is a white solid, is prepared from 2,2′-biphenol and phosphorus trichloride. It is prepared by the reaction of 2,2′-biphenol and phosphorus trichloride.
