= Benzophenone =

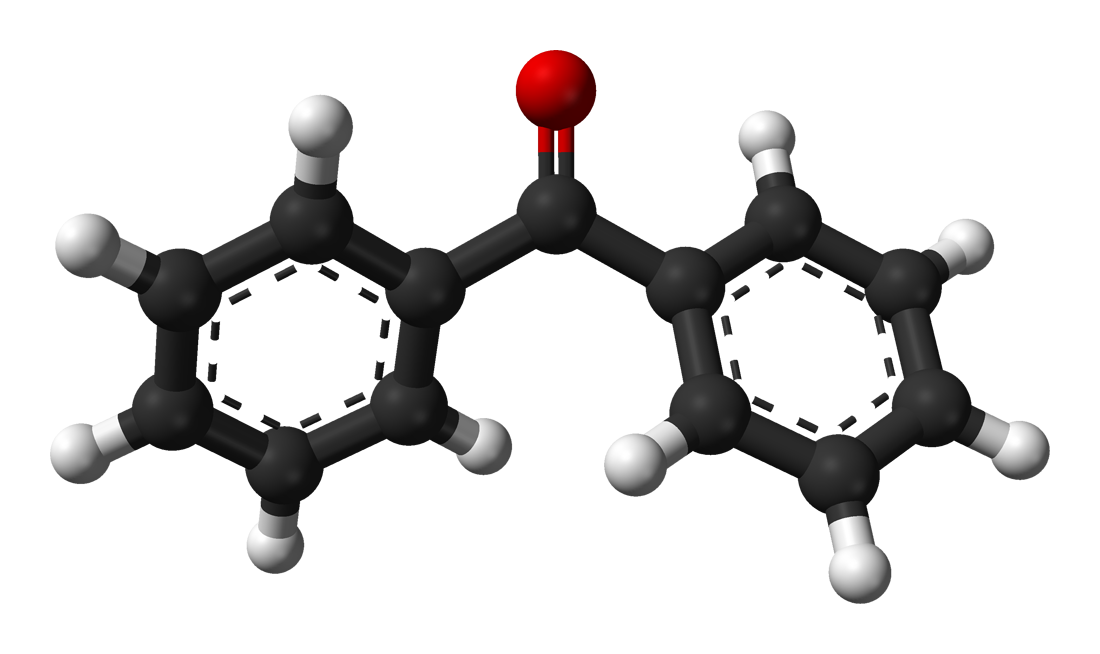

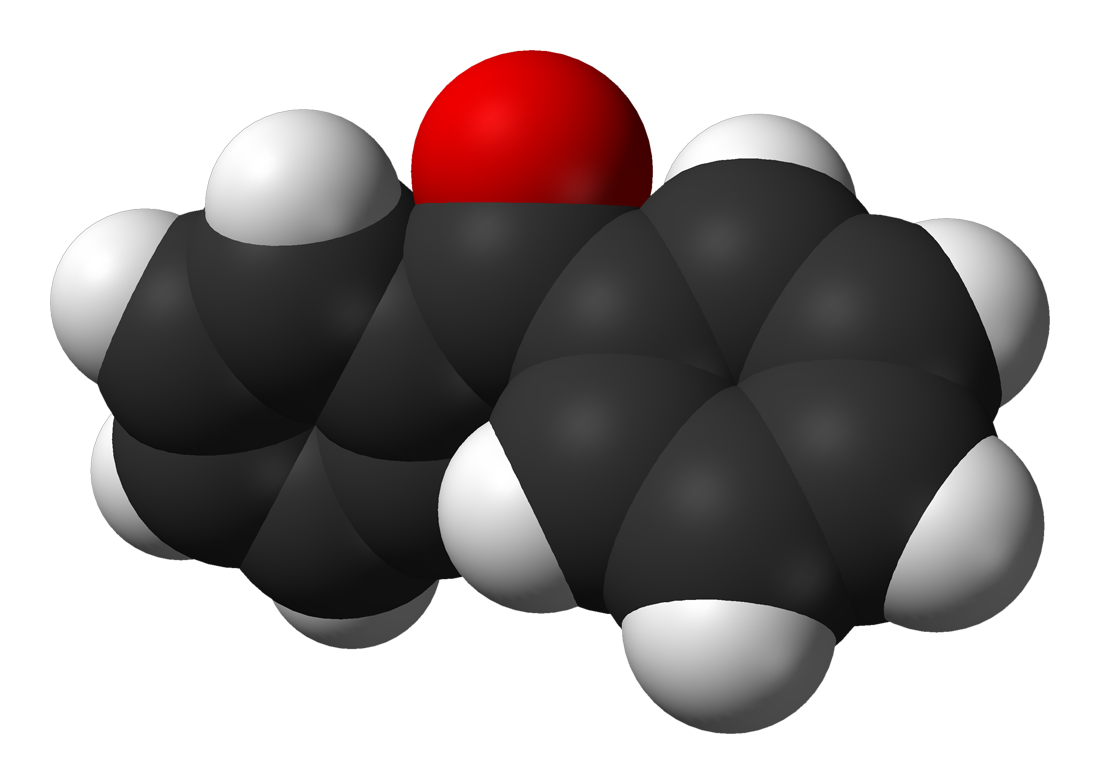

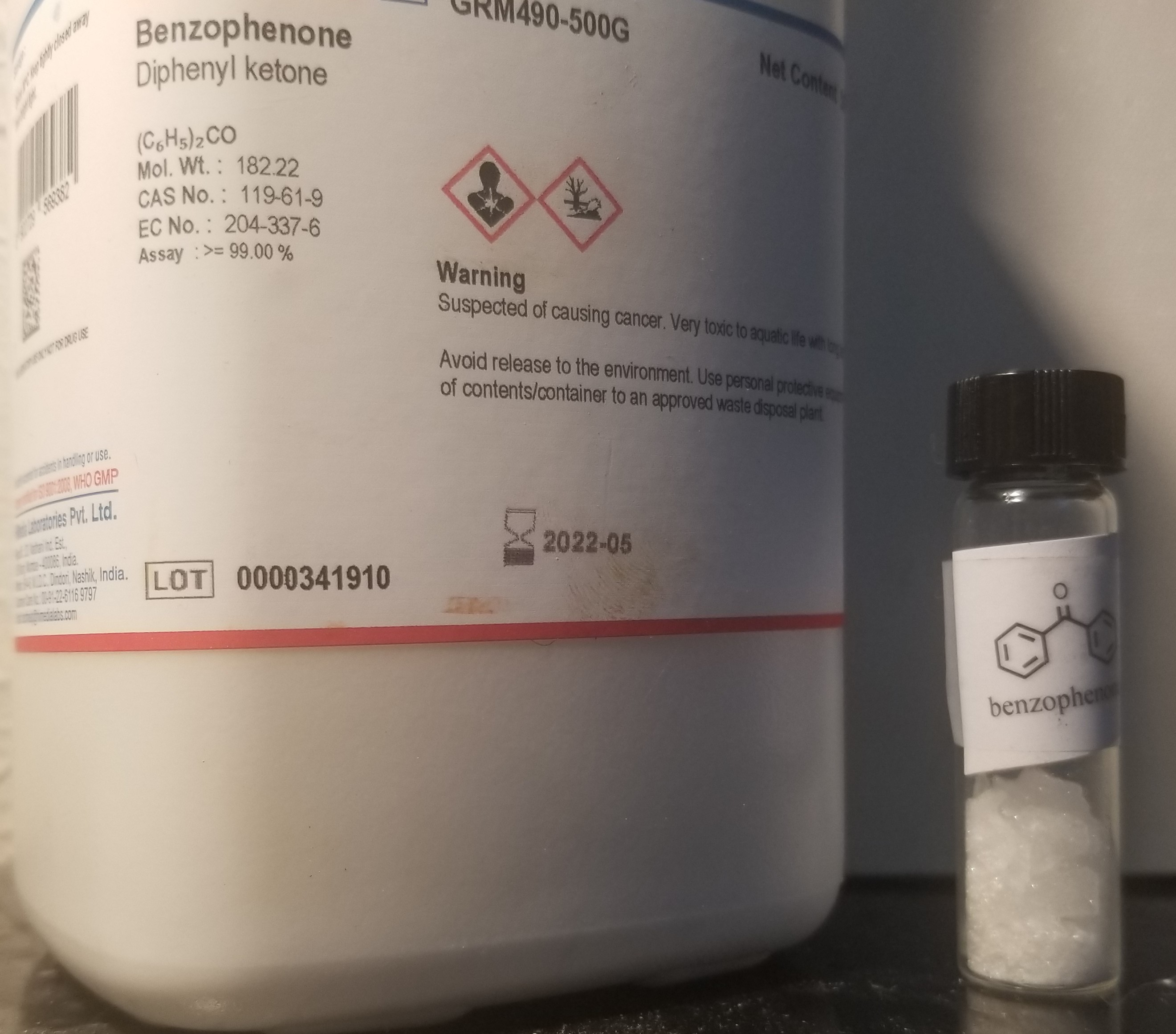

Names
- Preferred IUPAC name Diphenylmethanone
- Other names Benzophenone; Diphenyl ketone Benzoylbenzene; Benzoylphenyl

Identifiers
CAS Number	119-61-9
3D model (JSmol)	Interactive image
Beilstein Reference	1238185
ChEBI	CHEBI:41308
ChEMBL	ChEMBL90039
ChemSpider	2991
DrugBank	DB01878
ECHA InfoCard	100.003.943
EC Number	204-337-6
Gmelin Reference	4256
KEGG	C06354
PubChem CID	3102
RTECS number	DI9950000
UNII	701M4TTV9O
UN number	1224
CompTox Dashboard (EPA)	DTXSID0021961
- InChI: InChI=1S/C13H10O/c14-13(11-7-3-1-4-8-11)12-9-5-2-6-10-12/h1-10H Key: RWCCWEUUXYIKHB-UHFFFAOYSA-N; InChI=1/C13H10O/c14-13(11-7-3-1-4-8-11)12-9-5-2-6-10-12/h1-10H Key: RWCCWEUUXYIKHB-UHFFFAOYAX
- SMILES: O=C(c1ccccc1)c2ccccc2

Properties
Chemical formula	C_{13}H_{10}O
Molar mass	182.222 g·mol^{−1}
Appearance	White solid
Odor	Geranium-like
Density	1.11 g/cm^{3}
Melting point	48.5 °C (119.3 °F; 321.6 K)
Boiling point	305.4 °C (581.7 °F; 578.5 K)
Solubility in water	Insoluble
Solubility in organic solvents	1 g/7.5 mL in ethanol 1 g/6 mL in diethyl ether. Alkanes + tetrachloromethane: better with increasing tetrachloromethane content
Magnetic susceptibility (χ)	−109.6·10^{−6} cm^{3}/mol

Hazards
- Occupational safety and health (OHS/OSH)
Main hazards	Harmful (XN)
- GHS labelling
Pictograms	(GHS08: Health hazard) (GHS09: Environmental hazard)
Signal word	Warning
Hazard statements	H373, H411
Precautionary statements	P260, P273, P314, P391, P501
NFPA 704 (fire diamond)	1 1 0
Flash point	110 °C (230 °F; 383 K)
Safety data sheet (SDS)	External MSDS by Sigma-Aldritch
- Except where otherwise noted, data are given for materials in their standard state (at 25 °C [77 °F], 100 kPa). verify (what is ?) Infobox references

Benzophenone is a naturally occurring organic compound with the formula (C_{6}H_{5})_{2}CO, generally abbreviated Ph_{2}CO. Benzophenone has been found in some fungi, fruits and plants, including grapes. It is a white solid with a low melting point and rose-like odor that is soluble in organic solvents. Benzophenone is the simplest diaromatic ketone. It is a widely used building block in organic chemistry, being the parent diarylketone.

== History ==
Carl Graebe of the University of Königsberg, in an early literature report from 1874, described working with benzophenone.

== Uses ==
Benzophenone can be used as a photo initiator in ultraviolet (UV)-curing applications such as inks, imaging, and clear coatings in the printing industry. Benzophenone prevents UV light from damaging scents and colors in products such as perfumes and soaps.

Benzophenone can also be added to plastic packaging as a UV blocker to prevent photo-degradation of the packaging polymers or its contents. Its use allows manufacturers to package the product in clear glass or plastic (such as a PETE water bottle). Without it, opaque or dark packaging would be required.

In biological applications, benzophenones have been used extensively as photophysical probes to identify and map peptide–protein interactions.

Benzophenone is used as an additive in flavorings or perfumes for "sweet-woody-geranium-like notes".

== Synthesis ==
Benzophenone is produced by the copper-catalyzed oxidation of diphenylmethane with air.

A laboratory route involves the reaction of benzene with carbon tetrachloride followed by hydrolysis of the resulting diphenyldichloromethane. It can also be prepared by Friedel–Crafts acylation of benzene with benzoyl chloride in the presence of a Lewis acid (e.g. aluminium chloride) catalyst: since benzoyl chloride can itself be produced by the reaction of benzene with phosgene the first synthesis proceeded directly from those materials.

Another route of synthesis is through a palladium(II)/oxometalate catalyst. This converts an alcohol to a ketone with two groups on each side.

Another, less well-known reaction to produce benzophenone is the pyrolysis of anhydrous calcium benzoate.

== Organic chemistry ==
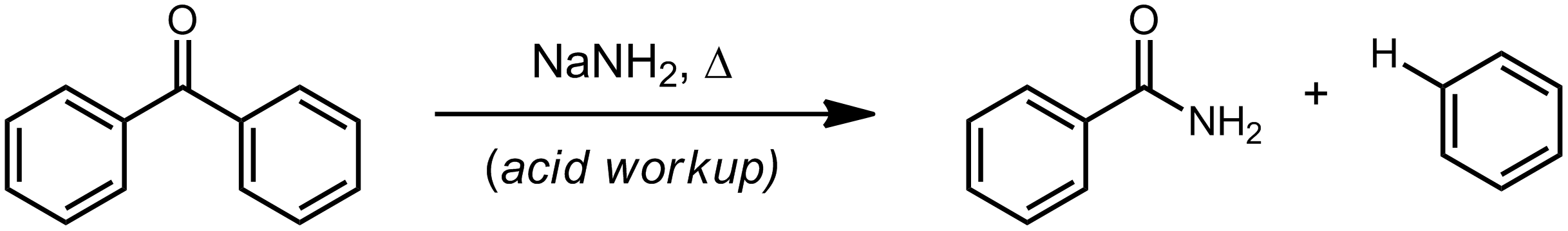
The Haller–Bauer reaction occurs between a non-enolizable ketone and a strong amide base. In this prototypical example involving benzophenone, the tetrahedral intermediate expels phenyl anion to give benzamide and benzene as the organic products.

Benzophenone is a common photosensitizer in photochemistry. It crosses from the S_{1} state into the triplet state with nearly 100% yield. The resulting diradical will abstract a hydrogen atom from a suitable hydrogen donor to form a ketyl radical.

=== Radical anion ===
Addition of a solution of benzophenone in THF to a vial containing THF, sodium metal, and a stir bar, yielding the deep blue benzophenone anion radical. Playback speed 4x original recording. Notice that the stirbar is not Teflon-coated, which would be attacked by the ketyl.

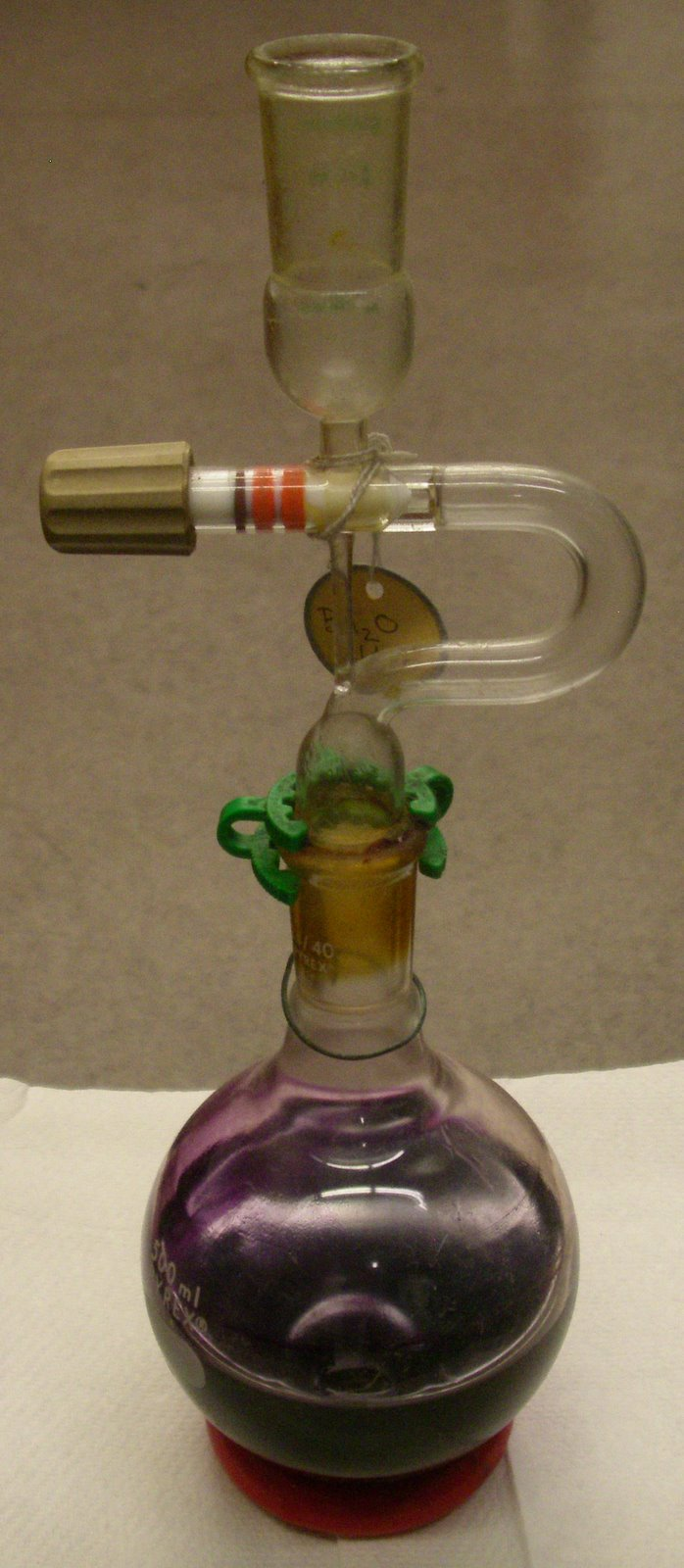
A solvent pot containing dibutyl ether solution of sodium benzophenone ketyl, which gives it its purple color.

Alkali metals reduce benzophenone to the deeply blue colored radical anion, diphenylketyl:

M + Ph_{2}CO → M^{+}Ph_{2}CO^{•−}

Generally sodium is used as the alkali metal. Sodium-benzophenone ketyl is used in the purification of organic solvents, particularly ethers, because it reacts with water and oxygen to give non-volatile products. Adsorbents such as alumina, silica gel, and especially molecular sieves are superior and far safer. The sodium-benzophenone method is common since it gives a visual indication that water, oxygen, and peroxides are absent from the solvent. Large scale purification may be more economical using devices which utilize adsorbents such as the aforementioned alumina or molecular sieves. The ketyl is soluble in the organic solvent being dried, which leads to faster purification. In comparison, sodium is insoluble, and its heterogeneous reaction is much slower. When excess alkali metal is present a second reduction may occur. The twice reduced specie presents as a clear red (extra-dry) solution. A color transformation from deep opaque blue (pure once-reduced benzophenone) to red with stages of opaque purple, indicate a mix of anion and bisanion.

M + M^{+}Ph_{2}CO^{•−} → (M^{+})_{2}(Ph_{2}CO)^{2−}

== Commercially significant benzophenones ==
The >300 natural benzophenones exhibit great structural diversity and biological activities. 2-Amino-5-chlorobenzophenone is used in the synthesis of benzodiazepines.

Substituted benzophenones such as oxybenzone and dioxybenzone are used in sunscreens. Their use has been criticized (see sunscreen controversy).

Michler's ketone has dimethylamino substituents at each para position.

The high-strength polymer PEEK is generated from 4,4'-difluorobenzophenone. 4,4′-Dihydroxybenzophenone is also of interest in this context. 4-Chloro-4'-hydroxybenzophenone is used to make related polymers.

== Safety ==
It is considered "essentially nontoxic". Benzophenone is however banned as a food additive by the US Food and Drug Administration, despite the FDA's continuing stance that this chemical does not pose a risk to public health under the conditions of its intended use.

The European Union permits it as a flavouring substance, having established a Total Dietary Intake of 0.3mg/kg of body weight per day.

Benzophenone derivatives are known to be pharmacologically active. From a molecular chemistry point of view interaction of benzophenone with B-DNA has been demonstrated experimentally. The interaction with DNA and the successive photo-induced energy transfer is at the base of the benzophenone activity as a DNA photosensitizer and may explain part of its therapeutic potentialities.

In 2014, benzophenones were named Contact Allergen of the Year by the American Contact Dermatitis Society.

Benzophenone is an endocrine disruptor capable of binding to the pregnane X receptor.
