= 4,4'-Dichlorodiphenyl sulfone =

4,4′-Dichlorodiphenyl sulfone

Names
- Preferred IUPAC name 1,1′-Sulfonylbis(4-chlorobenzene)
- Other names: Bis(4-chlorophenyl) sulfone; Bis(p-chlorophenyl) sulfone; p,p′-Dichlorodiphenyl sulfone; DCDPS

Identifiers
CAS Number	80-07-9
3D model (JSmol)	Interactive image; Interactive image
ChemSpider	6373
ECHA InfoCard	100.001.135
PubChem CID	6625
UNII	5U49794253
CompTox Dashboard (EPA)	DTXSID9024986
- InChI: InChI=1S/C12H8Cl2O2S/c13-9-1-5-11(6-2-9)17(15,16)12-7-3-10(14)4-8-12/h1-8H Key: GPAPPPVRLPGFEQ-UHFFFAOYSA-N; InChI=1/C12H8Cl2O2S/c13-9-1-5-11(6-2-9)17(15,16)12-7-3-10(14)4-8-12/h1-8H Key: GPAPPPVRLPGFEQ-UHFFFAOYAQ
- SMILES: O=S(=O)(c1ccc(Cl)cc1)c2ccc(Cl)cc2; O=S(=O)(c1ccc(Cl)cc1)c2ccc(Cl)cc2

Properties
Chemical formula	C_{12}H_{8}Cl_{2}O_{2}S
Molar mass	287.15 g·mol^{−1}
Appearance	White solid
Melting point	148 °C (298 °F; 421 K)
Boiling point	397 °C (747 °F; 670 K)
Solubility in water	Insoluble

Hazards
Safety data sheet (SDS)	External MSDS
- Except where otherwise noted, data are given for materials in their standard state (at 25 °C [77 °F], 100 kPa). verify (what is ?) Infobox references

4,4′-Dichlorodiphenyl sulfone (DCDPS) is an organic compound with the formula (ClC_{6}H_{4})_{2}SO_{2}. Classified as a sulfone, this white solid is most commonly used as a precursor to polymers that are rigid and temperature-resistant such as PES and Udel.

== Synthesis and reactions ==
DCDPS is synthesized via sulfonation of chlorobenzene with sulfuric acid, often in the presence of various additives to optimize the formation of the 4,4′-isomer:

ClC_{6}H_{5} + SO_{3} → (ClC_{6}H_{4})_{2}SO_{2} + H_{2}O

It can also be produced by chlorination of diphenylsulfone.

With chloride substituents susceptible to substitution, DCDPS is useful in the production of polysulfones. One such polymer, victrex, is prepared by the reaction of DCDPS with 4,4′-sulfonylbisphenol (bisphenol S). Similarly DCDPS reacts with bisphenol-A to give the polymer called Udel. These condensations are represented as follows:

n (ClC_{6}H_{4})_{2}SO_{2} + n NaO−X−ONa → [(O−X−OC_{6}H_{4})_{2}SO_{2}]_{n} + 2n NaCl
