= Phosphorochloridate =

Organophosphorus compound

In chemistry, a phosphorochloridate is a class of organophosphorus compounds with the formula (RO)_{2}P(O)Cl (R = organic substituent). They are tetrahedral in shape, akin to regular phosphates (OP(OR)_{3}). They are usually colorless and sensitive toward hydrolysis. They are oxidized derivatives of phosphorochloridites, which have the formula (RO)_{2}PCl. A popular example is diethyl phosphorochloridate.

== Synthesis and reactions ==
Phosphochloridites are precursors to phosphate esters:

(RO)_{2}P(O)Cl + R'OH → (R'O)(RO)_{2}P(O) + HCl

Other nucleophiles have been employed, such as azide.
