= 4,4'-Biphenol =

4,4′-Biphenol
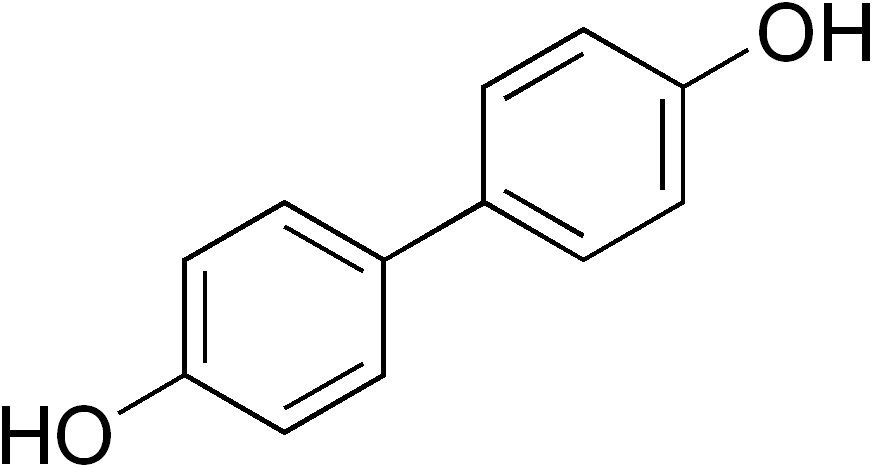
- Displayed structure of a 4,4′-biphenol molecule

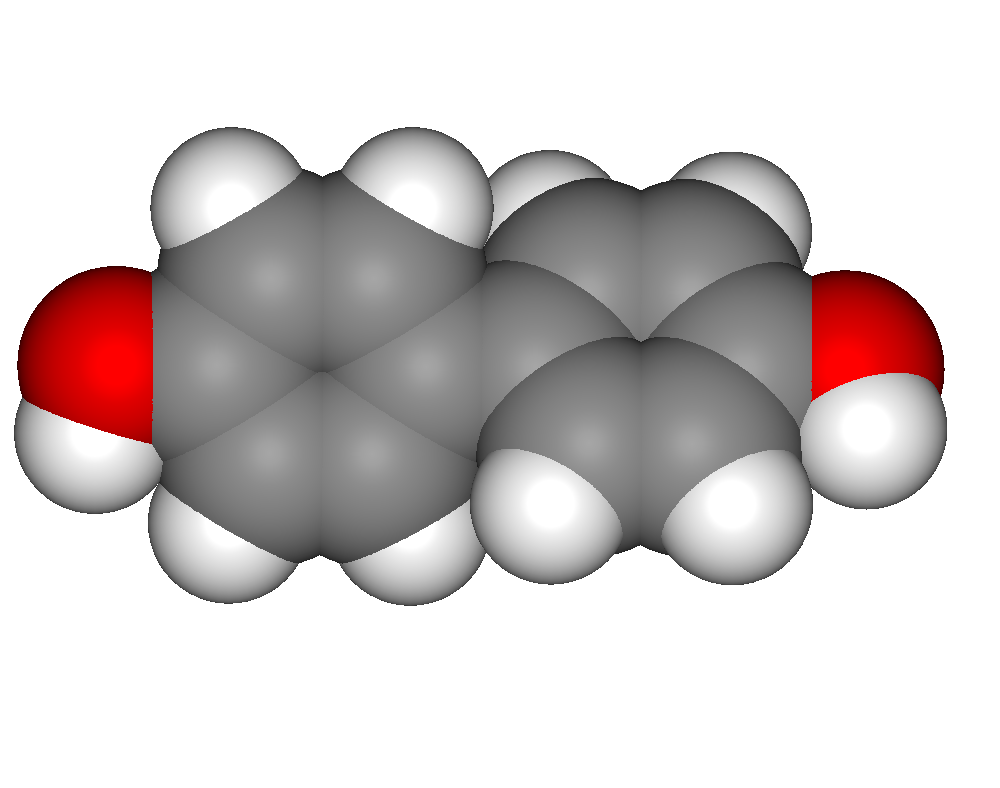
- 3D model of a 4,4′-biphenol molecule

Names
- Preferred IUPAC name [1,1′-Biphenyl]-4,4′-diol
- Other names 4,4′-Dihydroxybiphenyl; 4,4′-Diphenol; 4,4′-Biphenyldiol

Identifiers
CAS Number	92-88-6
3D model (JSmol)	Interactive image
ChEBI	CHEBI:34367
ChEMBL	ChEMBL76398
ChemSpider	6845
ECHA InfoCard	100.002.001
EC Number	202-200-5
KEGG	C14297
PubChem CID	7112
UNII	R8994A0904
CompTox Dashboard (EPA)	DTXSID1029120
- InChI: InChI=1S/C12H10O2/c13-11-5-1-9(2-6-11)10-3-7-12(14)8-4-10/h1-8,13-14H Key: VCCBEIPGXKNHFW-UHFFFAOYSA-N; InChI=1/C12H10O2/c13-11-5-1-9(2-6-11)10-3-7-12(14)8-4-10/h1-8,13-14H Key: VCCBEIPGXKNHFW-UHFFFAOYAM
- SMILES: Oc2ccc(c1ccc(O)cc1)cc2

Properties
Chemical formula	C_{12}H_{10}O_{2}
Molar mass	186.210 g·mol^{−1}
Appearance	colorless or white solid
Melting point	283 °C (541 °F; 556 K)
Boiling point	Sublimes
Solubility in water	Insoluble in water Soluble in ethanol and ether

Hazards
Flash point	> 93.3 °C (199.9 °F; 366.4 K)
Safety data sheet (SDS)	MSDS
- Except where otherwise noted, data are given for materials in their standard state (at 25 °C [77 °F], 100 kPa). verify (what is ?) Infobox references

4,4′-Biphenol is an organic compound with the formula (C_{6}H_{4}OH)_{2}/ It is one of three symmetrical isomers of biphenol. It is a colourless crystalline solid with a high melting point. It is primarily used in the production of polymers, particularly liquid crystals where it imparts high thermal stability, and PPSU-type polysulfone (also called polyphenylenesulfone, or Radel R).

== Synthesis ==
The industrial synthesis of 4,4′-biphenol was developed in the 1960s by Allan Hay, while working at the historic General Electric Research Laboratory. The reaction is driven by the formation and dimerisation of phenol radicals. As the direct oxidative coupling of phenols gives a mixture of isomers, 4,4′-biphenol is instead prepared from 2,6-di-tert-butylphenol, where para-coupling is the only possibility. A reaction with oxygen produces phenol-radicals which undergo rapid dimerisation, ultimately forming a diphenoquinone.

Synthesis of 4.4'-biphenol from 2,6-di-tert-butylphenol. Isobutylene is eliminated in the final stage.

This intermediate is reduced to the tetra-butyl-biphenyl derivative by a reaction with two equivalents of 2,6-di-tert-butylphenol, in an oxygen-free environment (with the radicals generated dimerising to form additional tetra-butyl-biphenyl). In the final step, high temperature dealkylation is performed to remove the butyl groups, producing the desired 4,4′-biphenol product. If groups less bulky that t-butyl are used then polyphenylene ethers such as poly(p-phenylene oxide) can be produced.

== Safety ==
4,4'-Biphenol exhibits estrogenic SAR.

== See also ==
- 2,2'-Biphenol
- Bisphenol
