= BiPhePhos =

Names
- Preferred IUPAC name 6,6′-[(3,3′-Di-tert-butyl-5,5′-dimethoxy-[1,1′-biphenyl]-2,2′-diyl)bis(oxy)]bis(6H-dibenzo[d,f][1,3,2]dioxaphosphepine)

Identifiers
CAS Number	121627-17-6
3D model (JSmol)	Interactive image
ChemSpider	9041113
EC Number	700-178-6
PubChem CID	329762141
UNII	LKX6732VAP
CompTox Dashboard (EPA)	DTXSID60746295
- InChI: InChI=1S/C46H44O8P2/c1-45(2,3)37-27-29(47-7)25-35(43(37)53-55-49-39-21-13-9-17-31(39)32-18-10-14-22-40(32)50-55)36-26-30(48-8)28-38(46(4,5)6)44(36)54-56-51-41-23-15-11-19-33(41)34-20-12-16-24-42(34)52-56/h9-28H,1-8H3 Key: WUFGFUAXCBPGOL-UHFFFAOYSA-N
- SMILES: CC(C)(C)C1=CC(=CC(=C1OP2OC3=CC=CC=C3C4=CC=CC=C4O2)C5=C(C(=CC(=C5)OC)C(C)(C)C)OP6OC7=CC=CC=C7C8=CC=CC=C8O6)OC

Properties
Chemical formula	C_{46}H_{44}O_{8}P_{2}
Molar mass	786.798 g·mol^{−1}
Appearance	white solid

Hazards
- GHS labelling
Pictograms	(GHS07: Exclamation mark)
Signal word	Warning
Hazard statements	H315, H319, H335, H412
Precautionary statements	P261, P264, P271, P273, P280, P302+P352, P304+P340, P305+P351+P338, P312, P321, P332+P313, P337+P313, P362, P403+P233, P405, P501
- Except where otherwise noted, data are given for materials in their standard state (at 25 °C [77 °F], 100 kPa). Infobox references

BiPhePhos is an organophosphorus compound that is used as a ligand in homogeneous catalysis. Classified as a diphosphite, BiPhePhos is derived from three 2,2'-biphenol groups, which constrain its shape in such a way to confer high selectivity to derived catalysts. Originally described by workers at Union Carbide, it has become a standard ligand in hydroformylation.

== See also ==
- 2,2'-Biphenylene phosphorochloridite (C_{12}H_{8}O_{2}PCl) precursor to BiPhePhos.
