= Polyetherimide =

Physical properties
- Density (ρ): 1.27 g/cc
- Water absorption—over 24 hours: 0.25%

Mechanical properties
- Tensile strength (σ_{t}): 115 MPa
- Elongation (ε) at break: 60-80%
- Izod impact strength: 25-60 J/m

Thermal properties
- Glass transition temperature (T_{g}): 215 C
- Heat deflection temperature at 0.46 MPa / 66 psi: 210 C
- Vicat softening point: 220 C
- Upper working temperature: 375 C
- Lower working temperature: 365 C
- Data via Sastri et al., 2014.

Polyetherimide

Names
- IUPAC name benzene-1,3-diamine; 5-[4-[2-[4-[(1,3-dioxo-2-benzofuran-5-yl)oxy]phenyl]propan-2-yl]phenoxy]-2-benzofuran-1,3-dione
- Other names PEI, Ultem

Identifiers
CAS Number	61128-46-9
3D model (JSmol)	Interactive image
ChemSpider	151672
ECHA InfoCard	100.126.800
PubChem CID	505862236
CompTox Dashboard (EPA)	DTXSID90976644
- SMILES: CC(C)(c1ccc(Oc2ccc3c(c2)C(=O)OC3=O)cc1)c1ccc(Oc2ccc3c(c2)C(=O)OC3=O)cc1.Nc1cccc(N)c1

Properties
Chemical formula	(C_{37}H_{24}O_{6}N_{2})_{n}
Molar mass	Variable
Appearance	Amber-to-transparent solid
Density	1.27 g/cm^{3}
- Except where otherwise noted, data are given for materials in their standard state (at 25 °C [77 °F], 100 kPa). verify (what is ?) Infobox references

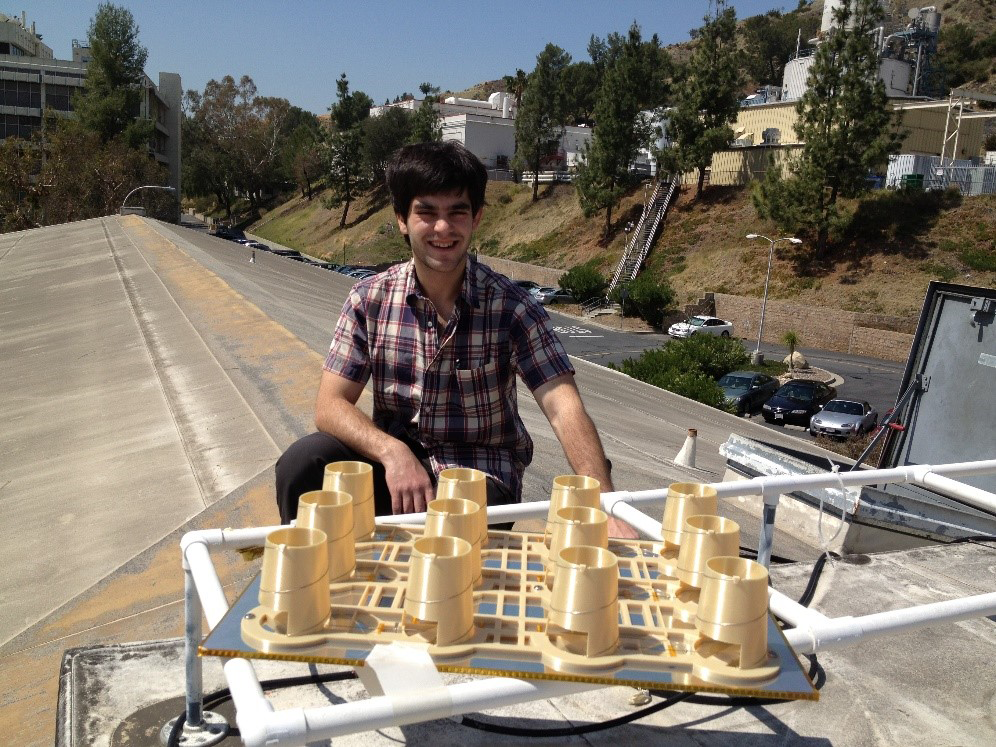
The COSMIC-2 RO antenna prototype "Cafeteria Cups" are fabricated out of 3D-printed FDM Ultem 9085

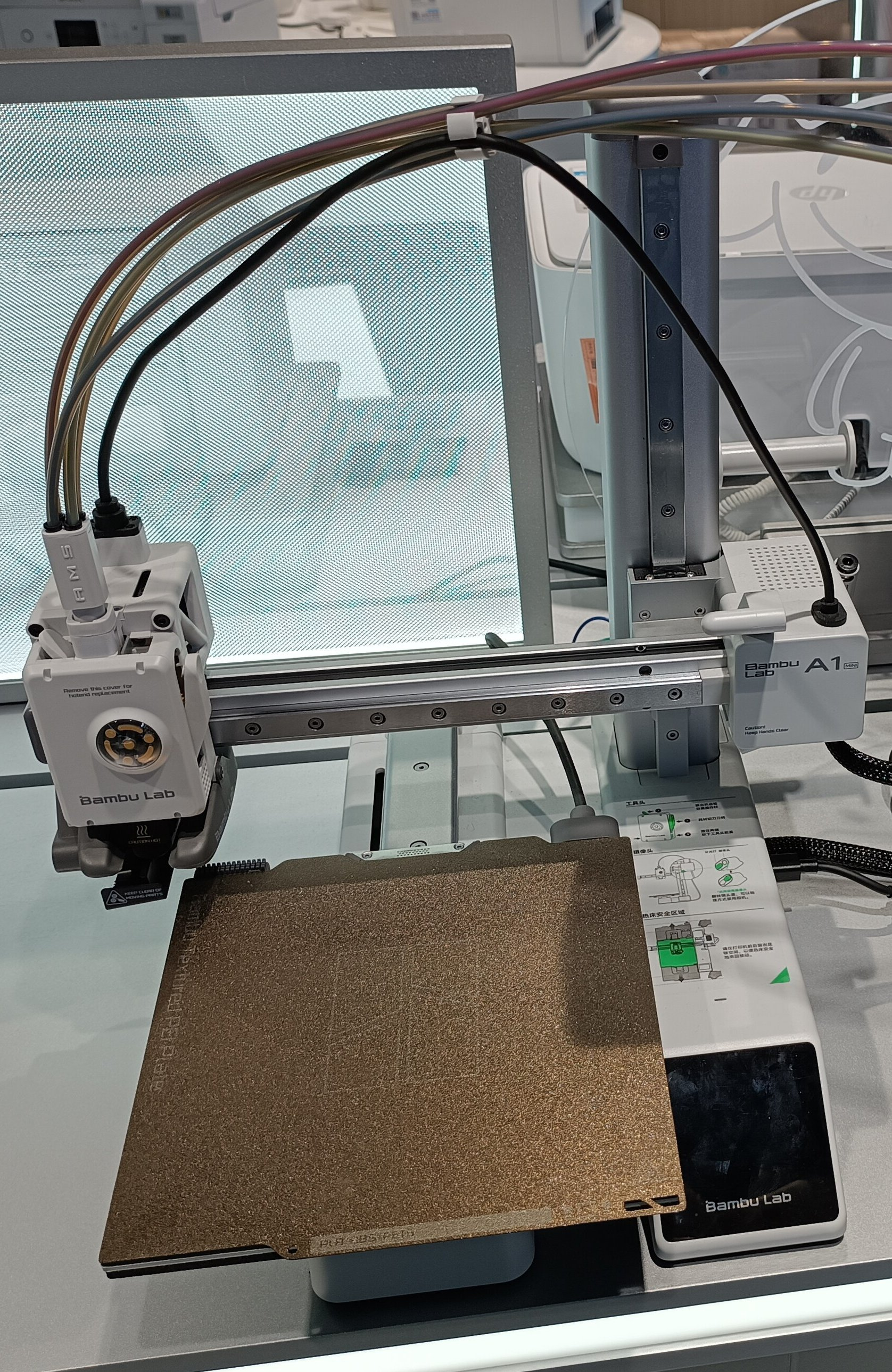
PEI powder-coated build plate on a Bambu Lab A1 mini FFF 3D printer

Polyetherimide (PEI; branded as Ultem) is an amorphous, amber-to-transparent thermoplastic with characteristics similar to the related plastic PEEK. When comparing PEI to PEEK, the former is cheaper but has lower impact strength and a tighter temperature range.

PEI plastics were first introduced into the market by General Electric (GE) in 1982 under the trade name Ultem resulting from the work of J.G. Wirth's research team in the early 1970s.

Due to its adhesive properties and chemical stability it became a popular bed material for FFF 3D printers.

== Structure ==
The molecular formula of the PEI repeating unit is C_{37}H_{24}O_{6}N_{2} and the molecular weight is 592.61 g/mol. It contains phthalimide and bisphenol A sub-units.

== Properties ==
The glass transition temperature of PEI is 217 °C (422 °F). Its amorphous density at 25 °C is 1.27 g/cm^{3}(.046 lb/in^{3}). It is prone to stress cracking in chlorinated solvents. Polyetherimide is able to resist high temperatures while maintaining stable electrical properties over a wide range of frequencies. This high strength material offers excellent chemical resistance and ductile properties suitable for various applications, even those involving steam exposure.

== Production ==
PEIs are manufactured by the imidization reaction of a flexible dianhydride and m-Phenylenediamine.
