= Victrex =

British-based supplier of polymers

- Company type: Public
- Traded as: LSE: VCT; FTSE 250 component
- Industry: Polymers
- Founded: 1993
- Headquarters: Victrex Technology Centre, Hillhouse International, Thornton Cleveleys, Lancashire, FY5 4QD, England, UK
- Key people: Vivienne Cox (Chairman); James Routh (Chief Executive)
- Revenue: ▲£292.7 million (2025)
- Operating income: ▼£39.8 million (2025)
- Net income: ▲£24.9 million (2025)
- Number of employees: 1,100 (2026)
- Website: Victrex.com

Victrex plc is a British-based supplier of high performance polymers. It is a constituent of the FTSE 250. The company's headquarters and manufacturing facilities are based in the UK with technical and customer support facilities in multiple markets, serving more than 40 countries. Victrex serves a diverse range of industries including aerospace, automotive, electronics, oil and gas and medical.

== History ==
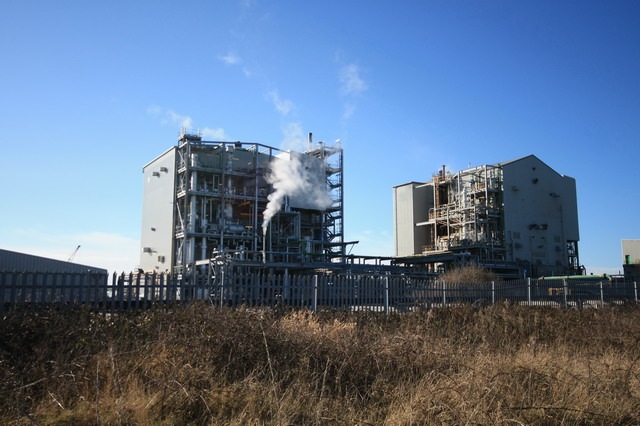
A Victrex plant near Blackpool

The company was established in 1993 by way of a management buyout of the PEEK polymer business of Imperial Chemical Industries plc. It was first listed on the London Stock Exchange in 1995. Based in Cleveleys near Blackpool in Lancashire Victrex has historically invested heavily to increase its capacity, most recently investing £90 million to increase production capacity by around 70%. By 2015 the production capacity of its polymer will be over 7,000 MT per annum (current capacity of 4,250 MT per annum).

== Operations ==
The company is a manufacturer of high-performance polyaryletherketones, including VICTREX PEEK polymer, VICTREX pipes and PEEK-OPTIMA. Its business is organized as two business units:

- Victrex Polymer Solutions (VPS) - that focuses on transport, industrial, oil and gas and the electronics markets
- Invibio Biomaterial Solutions (Invibio) - that focuses on implantable PEEK bio-material solutions

== Polysulfone ==
Victrex also refers to a particular type of polysulfone, an engineering plastic.
