= Octabenzone =

Names
- Preferred IUPAC name [2-Hydroxy-4-(octyloxy)phenyl](phenyl)methanone
- Other names Benzophenone-12, Spectra-Sorb UV 531, MPI Milestab 81

Identifiers
CAS Number	1843-05-6
3D model (JSmol)	Interactive image
ChemSpider	15020
ECHA InfoCard	100.015.838
KEGG	D00441
MeSH	(2-hydroxy-4-(octyloxy)phenyl)phenylmethanone
PubChem CID	15797
UNII	73P3618V2E
CompTox Dashboard (EPA)	DTXSID9027441
- InChI: InChI=1S/C21H26O3/c1-2-3-4-5-6-10-15-24-18-13-14-19(20(22)16-18)21(23)17-11-8-7-9-12-17/h7-9,11-14,16,22H,2-6,10,15H2,1H3 Key: QUAMTGJKVDWJEQ-UHFFFAOYSA-N; InChI=1/C21H26O3/c1-2-3-4-5-6-10-15-24-18-13-14-19(20(22)16-18)21(23)17-11-8-7-9-12-17/h7-9,11-14,16,22H,2-6,10,15H2,1H3 Key: QUAMTGJKVDWJEQ-UHFFFAOYAM
- SMILES: O=C(c1ccc(OCCCCCCCC)cc1O)c2ccccc2

Properties
Chemical formula	C_{21}H_{26}O_{3}
Molar mass	326.429 g/mol
Appearance	Light Yellow to Colourless Solid
Melting point	47–49 °C (117–120 °F; 320–322 K)
- Except where otherwise noted, data are given for materials in their standard state (at 25 °C [77 °F], 100 kPa). verify (what is ?) Infobox references

Octabenzone (Spectra-Sorb UV 531, MPI Milestab 81) is a UV absorber/screener. It is used to protect polymers (e.g., polyethylene, polypropylene, polyvinylchloride) against damage by UV light.
