= Printer cartridge =

Printer cartridge may refer to:

- Ink cartridge, used in inkjet printers
- Toner cartridge, used in laser printers
