= 4,4'-Difluorobenzophenone =

Names
- Preferred IUPAC name Bis(4-fluorophenyl)methanone

Identifiers
| CAS Number | 345-92-6 |
| 3D model (JSmol) | Interactive image |
| ChemSpider | 9206 |
| ECHA InfoCard | 100.005.879 |
| EC Number | 206-466-3 |
| PubChem CID | 9582 |
| UNII | 88BNC11B9C |
| CompTox Dashboard (EPA) | DTXSID30188062 |
- InChI: InChI=1S/C13H8F2O/c14-11-5-1-9(2-6-11)13(16)10-3-7-12(15)8-4-10/h1-8H Key: LSQARZALBDFYQZ-UHFFFAOYSA-N; InChI=1/C13H8F2O/c14-11-5-1-9(2-6-11)13(16)10-3-7-12(15)8-4-10/h1-8H Key: LSQARZALBDFYQZ-UHFFFAOYAZ
- SMILES: O=C(c1ccc(F)cc1)c2ccc(F)cc2

Properties
| Chemical formula | C_{13}H_{8}OF_{2} |
| Molar mass | 218.20 g/mol |
| Appearance | Colorless Solid |
| Melting point | 107.5 to 108.5 °C (225.5 to 227.3 °F; 380.6 to 381.6 K) |

Hazards
- GHS labelling
| Pictograms | (GHS07: Exclamation mark) (GHS09: Environmental hazard) |
| Signal word | Warning |
| Hazard statements | H302, H315, H319, H335, H411 |
| Precautionary statements | P261, P264, P270, P271, P273, P280, P301+P312, P302+P352, P304+P340, P305+P351+P338, P312, P321, P330, P332+P313, P337+P313, P362, P391, P403+P233, P405, P501 |
- Except where otherwise noted, data are given for materials in their standard state (at 25 °C [77 °F], 100 kPa). verify (what is ?) Infobox references

4,4’-Difluorobenzophenone is an organic compound with the formula of (FC_{6}H_{4})_{2}CO. This colorless solid is commonly used as a precursor to PEEK, or polyether ether ketone, a so-called high performance polymer. Because PEEK is resistant to attack, it is commonly used in carbon fiber coatings and cable insulation.

== Synthesis ==
4,4’-Difluorobenzophenone is prepared by the acylation of fluorobenzene with p-fluorobenzoyl chloride. The conversion is typically conducted in the presence of an aluminium chloride catalyst in a petroleum ether solvent.

FC_{6}H_{4}C(O)Cl + C_{6}H_{5}F → (FC_{6}H_{4})_{2}CO + HCl

== Uses ==
The polymer PEEK is generated from the reaction of 4,4'-difluorobenzophenone with the salts of 1,4-benzenediol.

C_{6}H_{4}(ONa)_{2} + (FC_{6}H_{4})_{2}CO → 1/n[(C_{6}H_{4}O_{2})(C_{13}H_{8}O)]_{n} + 2 NaF
