= 2,2'-Biphenol =

2,2′-Biphenol

Names
- Preferred IUPAC name [1,1′-Biphenyl]-2,2′-diol
- Other names o,o′-Dihydroxybiphenyl

Identifiers
CAS Number	1806-29-7
3D model (JSmol)	Interactive image
Beilstein Reference	1638363
ChEBI	CHEBI:28970
ChEMBL	ChEMBL183874
ChemSpider	14959
ECHA InfoCard	100.015.730
EC Number	217-303-0
Gmelin Reference	51261
KEGG	C03209
PubChem CID	15731
UNII	PM2R53I3C9
CompTox Dashboard (EPA)	DTXSID6051809
- InChI: InChI=1S/C12H10O2/c13-11-7-3-1-5-9(11)10-6-2-4-8-12(10)14/h1-8,13-14H Key: IMHDGJOMLMDPJN-UHFFFAOYSA-N
- SMILES: C1=CC=C(C(=C1)C2=CC=CC=C2O)O

Properties
Chemical formula	C_{12}H_{10}O_{2}
Molar mass	186.210 g·mol^{−1}
Appearance	white solid
Melting point	109 °C (228 °F; 382 K)
Boiling point	320 °C (608 °F; 593 K)

Hazards
- GHS labelling
Pictograms	(GHS05: Corrosive) (GHS07: Exclamation mark)
Signal word	Danger
Hazard statements	H302, H315, H318, H319, H335
Precautionary statements	P261, P264, P270, P271, P280, P301+P312, P302+P352, P304+P340, P305+P351+P338, P310, P312, P321, P330, P332+P313, P337+P313, P362, P403+P233, P405, P501
- Except where otherwise noted, data are given for materials in their standard state (at 25 °C [77 °F], 100 kPa). Infobox references

2,2′-Biphenol is an organic compound with the formula (C_{6}H_{4}OH)_{2}. It is one of three symmetrical isomers of biphenol. A white solid, it is a precursor to diphosphite ligands that are used to support industrial hydroformylation catalysis.

BiPhePhos is representative diphosphite ligand derived from a derivative of 2,2′-biphenol.

== Synthesis ==
2,2′-Biphenol can be made by hydrolysis of dibenzofuran. Alternatively, it can be produced from 2,4-di-tert-butylphenol in two steps. The first step entails oxidative coupling to give the 2,2′-biphenol with four tert-butyl substituents. Upon heating, this species then undergoes debutylation.

== See also ==
- 1,1′-Bi-2-naphthol
