= Polyaryletherketone =

Polymer family

Polyaryletherketone (PAEK) is a family of semi-crystalline thermoplastics with high-temperature stability and high mechanical strength whose molecular backbone contains alternately ketone (R-CO-R) and ether groups (R-O-R). The linking group R between the functional groups consists of a 1,4-substituted aryl group.

== Properties ==
PAEK has a continuous operating temperature of 250 °C (482 °F) and under short-term loads can function up to 350 °C (662 °F). When burned it has the least toxic and corrosive fumes. It also has a low heat output when burned, so it qualifies for use in interior aviation applications. It also has good overall chemical resistance.

It has a tensile strength of 85 MPa (12,300 psi) and a Young's modulus of 4,100 MPa (590,000 psi). Its yield strength is 104 MPa (15,100 psi) at 23 °C (73 °F) and 37 MPa (5,400 psi) at 160 °C (320 °F). It does not break in an un-notched Izod impact test.

== Chemistry ==
PAEK plastics are characterized by phenylene rings that are linked via oxygen bridges (ether and carbonyl groups (ketone)). The ratio and sequence of ether to ketones mainly affects the glass transition temperature and melting point of the polymer. It also affects its heat resistance and processing temperature. The higher the ratio of ketones the more rigid the polymer chain, which results in a higher glass transition temperature and melting point. The processing temperatures can range from 350 to 430 °C.

Plastics that fall within this family include:

- PEK
- PEEK
- PEKK
- PEEKK
- PEKEKK (polyetherketoneetherketoneketone)

== Production ==
PAEKs can be produced in two ways, one is called the nucleophilic route and the other is called the electrophilic route. The nucleophilic route has the formation of ether linkages in the polymerization step. The electrophilic route has the formation of carbonyl bridges during the polymerization step.

It can be processed using all of the typical thermoplastic processes, such as injection molding, extrusion, compression molding, additive manufacturing, and transfer molding.

== Applications ==
One major engineering application is oil drilling components, such as seals, compressor rings, valve parts, gears, bearings, and wire coatings. It is also used in the chemical pump industry because it can withstand the temperature, stress, and has the corrosion resistance. In the automotive industry it is used to make gears and thrust bearings in transmissions.

Due to its excellent resistance to hydrolysis it is used in medical devices because it does not break down when sterilized. PEKEKK is used to make surgical implants, such as artificial hips.
