= Hydroxyl ion absorption =

Transmission loss in optical fibers

Hydroxyl ion absorption is the absorption in optical fibers of electromagnetic radiation, including the near-infrared, due to the presence of trapped hydroxyl ions remaining from water as a contaminant.

The hydroxyl (OH^{−}) ion can penetrate glass during or after product fabrication, resulting in significant attenuation of discrete optical wavelengths, e.g., centred at 1.383 μm, used for communications via optical fibres.

== See also ==
- Electromagnetic absorption by water
