= Dioxybenzone =

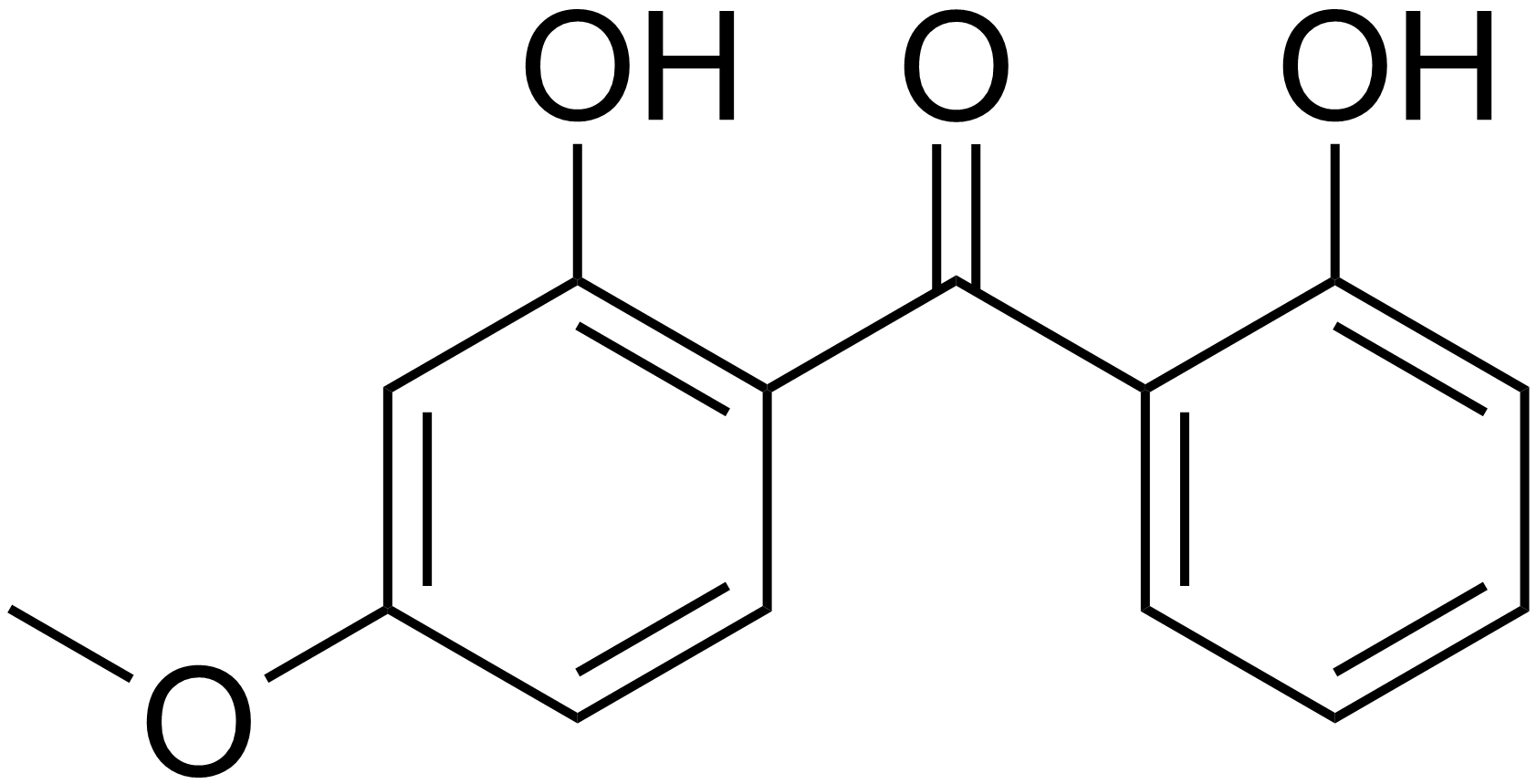
- Dioxybenzone

Names
- Preferred IUPAC name (2-Hydroxy-4-methoxyphenyl)(2-hydroxyphenyl)methanone
- Other names Dioxybenzone benzophenone-8

Identifiers
CAS Number	131-53-3
3D model (JSmol)	Interactive image; Interactive image
ChEMBL	ChEMBL1326877
ChemSpider	8251
ECHA InfoCard	100.004.571
KEGG	D03853
PubChem CID	8569
UNII	B762XZ551X
CompTox Dashboard (EPA)	DTXSID3022403
- InChI: InChI=1S/C14H12O4/c1-18-9-6-7-11(13(16)8-9)14(17)10-4-2-3-5-12(10)15/h2-8,15-16H,1H3 Key: MEZZCSHVIGVWFI-UHFFFAOYSA-N; InChI=1/C14H12O4/c1-18-9-6-7-11(13(16)8-9)14(17)10-4-2-3-5-12(10)15/h2-8,15-16H,1H3 Key: MEZZCSHVIGVWFI-UHFFFAOYAR
- SMILES: O=C(C2=CC=CC=C2O)C1=C(O)C=C(OC)C=C1; O=C(c1ccc(OC)cc1O)c2ccccc2O

Properties
Chemical formula	C_{14}H_{12}O_{4}
Molar mass	244.25 g/mol
Density	1.38 g/cm^{3}
Melting point	68 °C (154 °F; 341 K)
Boiling point	170 to 175 °C (338 to 347 °F; 443 to 448 K)
- Except where otherwise noted, data are given for materials in their standard state (at 25 °C [77 °F], 100 kPa). verify (what is ?) Infobox references

Dioxybenzone (benzophenone-8) is an organic compound used in sunscreen to block UVB and short-wave UVA (ultraviolet) rays. It is a derivative of benzophenone. It is a yellow powder with a melting point of 68 °C. It is insoluble in water, but moderately soluble in ethanol and isopropanol.
