= Polysulfone =

Class of high performance thermoplastic polymers

Polysulfone (PSU) repeating unit.

Polyethersulfone (PES) repeating unit.

Polysulfones are a family of high-performance thermoplastics. These polymers are known for their toughness and stability at high temperatures. Technically used polysulfones contain an aryl-SO_{2}-aryl subunit. Due to the high cost of raw materials and processing, polysulfones are used in specialty applications and often are a superior replacement for polycarbonates.

Three polysulfones are used industrially: polysulfone (PSU), polyethersulfone (PES/PESU), and polyphenylsulfone (PPSU). They can be used at temperature of −100–200 °C (−148–392 °F) and are used for electrical equipment, vehicle construction, and medical technology. They are composed of para-linked aromatics, sulfonyl groups, and ether groups and partly also alkyl groups. Polysulfones have outstanding resistance to heat, oxidation, hydrolysis, aqueous media, and alkaline media, and they have good electrical properties.

== Nomenclature ==
The term "polysulfone" is normally used for polyarylethersulfones (PAES), since only aromatic polysulfones are used commercially. Furthermore, since ether groups are always present in these polysulfones, PAESs are also referred to as polyether sulfones (PES), poly(arylene sulfone)s or simply polysulfone (PSU).

== Production ==
=== Historical ===
The simplest polysulfone, poly(phenylene sulfone), known as early as 1960, is produced in a Friedel-Crafts reaction from benzenesulfonyl chloride:

n C_{6}H_{5}SO_{2}Cl → (C_{6}H_{4}SO_{2})_{n} + n HCl

With a melting point over 500 °C, the product is difficult to process. It exhibits attractive heat resistance, but its mechanical properties are rather poor. Polyarylether sulphones (PAES) represent a suitable alternative. Appropriate synthetic routes to PAES were developed almost simultaneously, and yet independently, from 3M Corporation, Union Carbide Corporation in the United States, and ICI's Plastics Division in the United Kingdom. The polymers found at that time are still used today, but produced by a different synthesis process.

The original synthesis of PAES involved electrophilic aromatic substitution of a diaryl ether with the bis (sulfonyl chloride) of benzene. Reactions typically use a Friedel-Crafts catalyst, such as ferric chloride or antimony pentachloride:

n O(C_{6}H_{5})_{2} + n SO_{2}Cl_{2} → {[O(C_{6}H_{4})_{2}]SO_{2}}_{n} + 2n HCl

This route is complicated by the formation of isomers arising from both para- and ortho- substitution. Furthermore, cross-linking was observed, which strongly affects the mechanical properties of the polymer. This method has been abandoned.

=== Contemporary production methods ===
PAES are currently prepared by a polycondensation reaction of diphenoxide and bis(4-chlorophenyl)sulfone (DCDPS). The sulfone group activates the chloride groups toward substitution. The required diphenoxide is produced in situ from a diphenol and sodium hydroxide. The cogenerated water is removed by azeotropic distillation using toluene or chlorobenzene). The polymerization is carried out at 130–160 °C under inert conditions in a polar, aprotic solvent, such as dimethyl sulfoxide, forming a polyether concomitant with elimination of sodium chloride:

Bis(4-fluorophenyl)sulfone can be used in place of bis(4-chlorophenyl)sulfone. The difluoride is more reactive than the dichloride but more expensive. Through chain terminators (e.g. methyl chloride), the chain length can be controlled for melt-processing.

The diphenol is typically bisphenol-A or 1,4-dihydroxybenzene. Such step polymerizations require highly pure monomer and precise stoichiometry to ensure high-molecular-weight products.

DCDPS is the precursor to polymers known as Udel (from bisphenol A), PES, and Radel R. Udel is a high-performance amorphous sulfone polymer that can molded into a variety of different shapes. It is both rigid and temperature-resistant, and has applications in everything from plumbing pipes, to printer cartridges, to automobile fuses. DCDPS also reacts with bisphenol S to form PES. Like Udel, PES is a rigid and thermally-resistant material with numerous applications.

== Properties ==
Polysulfones are rigid, high-strength and transparent. They are also characterized by high strength and stiffness, retaining these properties between −100 °C and 150 °C. The glass transition temperature of polysulfones is between 190 and 230 °C. They have a high dimensional stability: the size change when exposed to boiling water or 150 °C air or steam generally falls below 0.1%. Polysulfone is highly resistant to mineral acids, alkali, and electrolytes, in pH ranging from 2 to 13. It is resistant to oxidizing agents (although PES will degrade over time); therefore, it can be cleaned by bleaches. It is also resistant to surfactants and hydrocarbon oils. It is not resistant to low-polar organic solvents (e.g. ketones and chlorinated hydrocarbons) and aromatic hydrocarbons. Mechanically, polysulfone has high compaction resistance, recommending its use under high pressures. It is also stable in aqueous acids and bases and many non-polar solvents; however, it is soluble in dichloromethane and methylpyrrolidone.

Polysulfones are counted among the high-performance plastics. They can be processed by injection molding, extrusion, or hot forming.

=== Structure-property relationship ===
Poly(aryl ether sulfone)s are composed of aromatic groups, ether groups, and sulfonyl groups. For a comparison of the properties of individual constituents, poly(phenylene sulfone) can serve as an example, which consists of sulfonyl and phenyl groups only. Since both groups are thermally very stable, poly(phenylene sulfone) has an extremely high melting temperature (520 °C). However, the polymer chains are also so rigid that poly(phenylene sulfone) (PAS) decomposes before melting and can thus not be thermoplastically processed. Therefore, flexible elements must be incorporated into the chains; this is done in the form of ether groups. Ether groups allow a free rotation of the polymer chains. This leads to a significantly reduced melting point and also improves the mechanical properties by an increased impact strength. The alkyl groups in bisphenol A act also as a flexible element.

The stability of the polymer can also be attributed to individual structural elements. The sulfonyl group (in which sulfur is in the highest possible oxidation state) attracts electrons from neighboring benzene rings, causing electron deficiency. The polymer therefore opposes further electron loss, thus substantiating the high oxidation resistance. The sulfonyl group is also linked to the aromatic system by mesomerism and the bond therefore strengthened by mesomeric energy. As a result, larger amounts of energy from heat or radiation can be absorbed by the molecular structure without causing any reactions (decomposition). The result of the mesomerism is that the configuration is particularly rigid. Based on the biphenylsulfonyl group, the polymer is thus durable heat resistant, oxidation resistant and still has a high stiffness even at elevated temperatures. The ether bond provides (as opposed to esters) hydrolysis resistance as well as some flexibility, which leads to impact strength. In addition, the ether bond leads to good heat resistance and better flow of the melt.

== Applications ==
Polysulfone has one of the highest service temperatures among all melt-processable thermoplastics. Its resistance to high temperatures gives it a role of a flame retardant, without compromising its strength that usually results from addition of flame retardants. Its high hydrolysis stability allows its use in medical applications requiring autoclave and steam sterilization. However, it has low resistance to some solvents and undergoes weathering; this weathering instability can be offset by adding other materials into the polymer.

=== Membranes ===
Polysulfone allows easy manufacturing of membranes, with reproducible properties and controllable size of pores down to 40 nanometers. Such membranes can be used in applications like hemodialysis, waste-water recovery, food and beverage processing, and gas separation. These polymers are also used in the automotive and electronic industries. Filter cartridges made from polysulfone membranes offer extremely high flow rates at very low differential pressures when compared with nylon or polypropylene media.

Polysulfone can be used as filtration media in filter sterilization.

=== Materials ===
Polysulfone can be reinforced with glass fibers. The resulting composite material has twice the tensile strength and three times increase of its Young's modulus.

=== Fuel cells ===
Polysulfone is often used as a copolymer. Recently, sulfonated polyethersulfones (SPES) have been studied as a promising material candidate among many other aromatic hydrocarbon-based polymers for highly durable proton-exchange membranes in fuel cells. Several reviews have reported progress on durability from many reports on this work. The biggest challenge for SPES application in fuel cells is improving its chemical durability. Under oxidative environment, SPES can undergo sulfonic group detachment and main chain scission. However the latter is more dominant; midpoint scission and unzip mechanism have been proposed as the degradation mechanism depending on the strength of the polymer backbone.

=== Food service industry ===
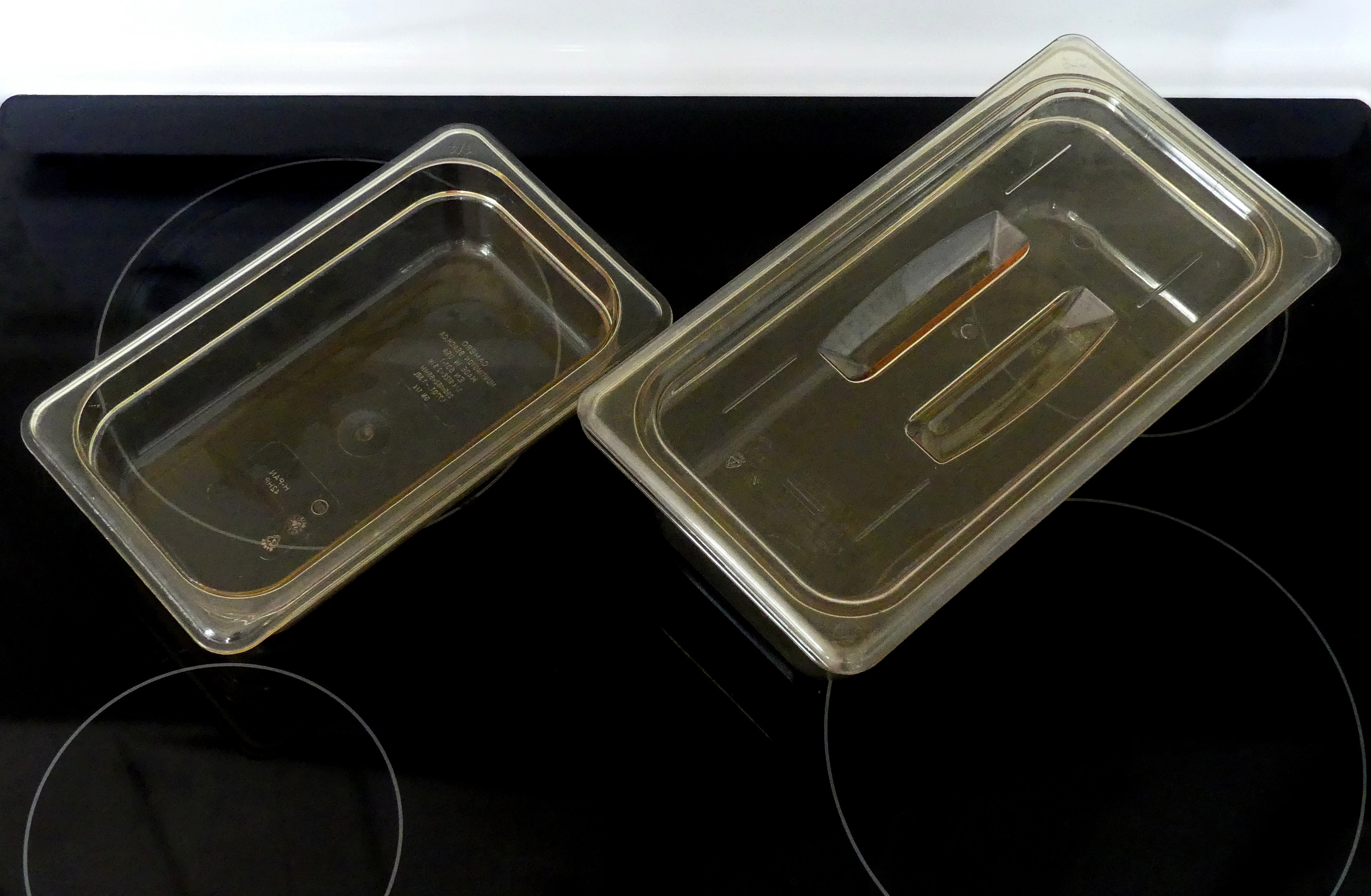
Pair of high heat food pans made of polysulfone

Polysulfone food pans are used for the storage, heating, and serving of foods. The pans are made to Gastronorm standards and are available in the natural transparent amber colour of polysulfone. The wide working temperature range of –40 °C to +190 °C allow these pans to go from a deep freezer directly to a steam table or microwave oven. Polysulfone provides a non-stick surface for minimal food wastage and easy cleaning.

== Industrially relevant polysulfones ==
Some industrially relevant polysulfones are listed in the following table:

Structural formula	trade name	Systematic Name	CAS
Strukturformel von Polyarylensulfone (PAS).	Poly(arylene sulfone) (PAS)		
Strukturformel von Polybisphenylsulfon (PSF).	poly(bisphenol-A sulfone) (PSF)	Poly[oxy-1,4-phenylensulfonyl-1,4-phenylenoxy-1,4-phenylen(1-methylethyliden)-1,4-phenylen]	25135-51-7
Strukturformel von Polyethersulfon (PES).	Polyether sulfone (PES)	Poly(oxy-1,4-phenylsulfonyl-1,4-phenyl)	25608-63-3
Strukturformel von Polyphenylensulfon (PPSU).	Polyphenylenesulfone (PPSU)		25608-64-4
Strukturformel von Victrex HTA.	Victrex HTA		121763-41-5
