= Polyetherketoneketone =

Identifiers
| CAS Number | 29658-26-2 |
| Abbreviations | PEKK |
| ChemSpider | none |
| ECHA InfoCard | 100.133.809 |
| CompTox Dashboard (EPA) | DTXSID4094534 |

Properties
| Density | 1.278 g/cm^{3} |
- Except where otherwise noted, data are given for materials in their standard state (at 25 °C [77 °F], 100 kPa). Infobox references

Polyetherketoneketone (PEKK) is a semi-crystalline thermoplastic in the polyaryletherketone (PAEK) family of polymers. It possesses high heat, chemical, and mechanical load resistance. PEKK has a glass transition temperature (Tg) of 162 °C.

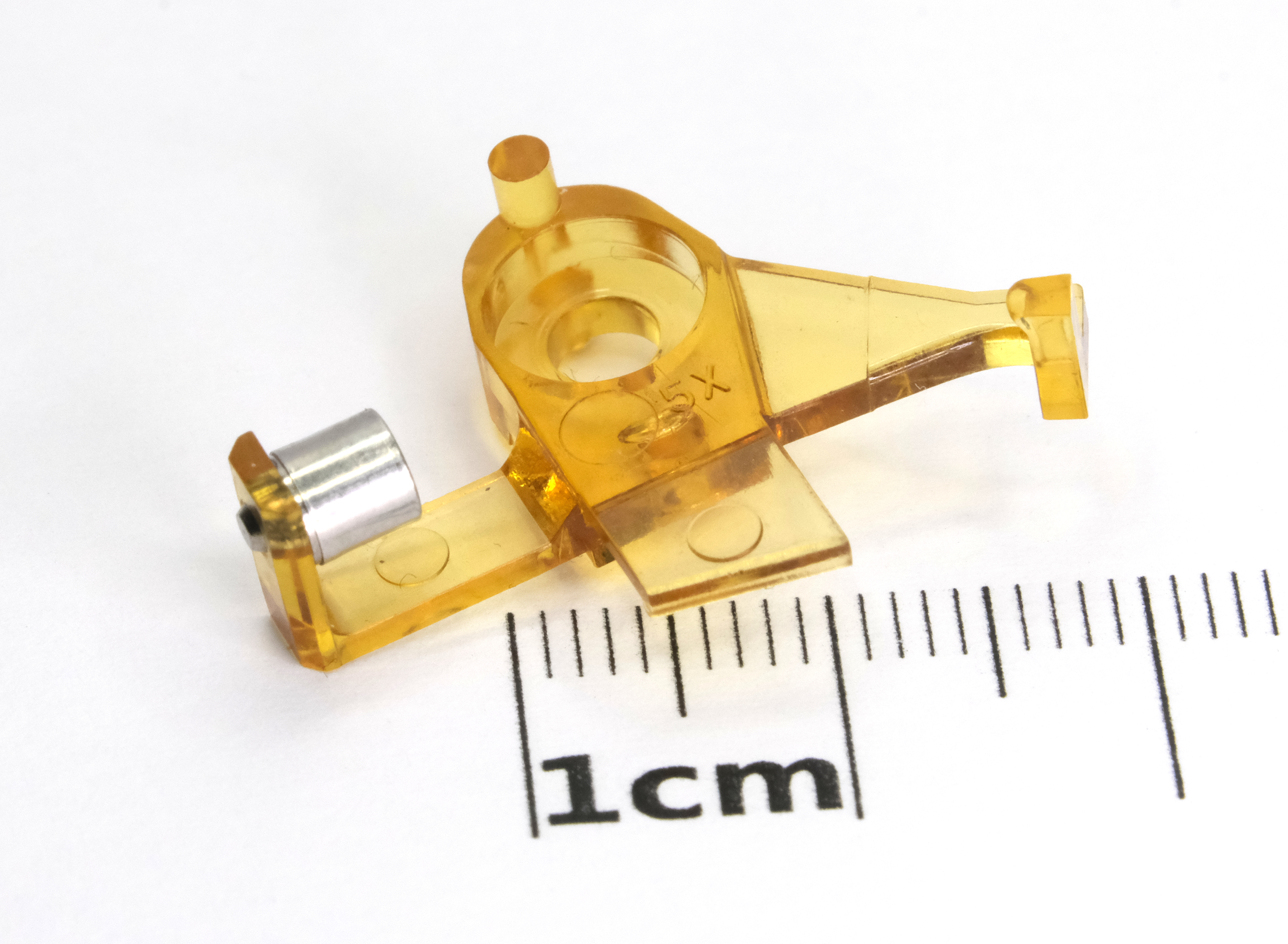
HDD part made from Polyetherketoneketone

== Applications ==
Hexcel Corporation (Formerly Oxford Performance Materials) manufactures PEKK-based parts for Boeing for use in its Starliner space taxis, using 3D printing-based additive manufacturing. It has wide dental and medical applications. The parts are claimed to be as strong as aluminum while being 40 percent of the weight. In addition, PEKK manufactured components have shown fire and radiation resistant properties.

Oxford Performance Materials manufactures Biomedical 3D printing of PEKK parts. In addition, the company has a solution casting technology to apply a nanoscale coating of PEKK to various mediums.
