= Biphenol =

Chemical compound

In organic chemistry, a biphenol refers to compounds with the formula (C_{6}H_{4}OH)_{2}. Such compounds formally result from the coupling of two phenols. All are colorless solids with the formula (C_{6}H_{4}OH)_{2}. Three symmetrical isomers of biphenol exist:

Name	Registry number	PubChem	Melting point (°C)
2,2'-Biphenol	1806-29-7		109
3,3'-Biphenol	612-76-0		124.8
4,4'-Biphenol	92-88-6		283

Additionally, three unsymmetrical isomers of biphenols exist

Name	Registry number	PubChem	Melting point (°C)
2,3'-Biphenol	31835-45-7		
2,4'-Biphenol	611-62-1		162–163
3,4'-Biphenol	18855-13-5		190
