= Polyether ether ketone =

Semicrystalline thermoplastic with high mechanical and chemical resistance

Names
- Other names PEEK; Polyetheretherketone

Identifiers
CAS Number	31694-16-3
PubChem CID	19864017

Properties
Chemical formula	(C_{19}H_{12}O_{3})_{n}
Molar mass	288.3 g/mol
Density	1.32 g/cm^{3}
Melting point	343 °C (649 °F; 616 K)

Related compounds
Related compounds	Hydroquinone; 4,4'-Difluorobenzophenone
- Except where otherwise noted, data are given for materials in their standard state (at 25 °C [77 °F], 100 kPa). Infobox references

Polyether ether ketone

Physical properties
- Density (ρ): 1.32 g/cm^{3}
- Water absorption—over 24 hours: 0.1%

Mechanical properties
- Young's modulus (E): 3.6 GPa
- Tensile strength (σ_{t}): 90–100 MPa
- Elongation (ε) at break: 50%
- Notch test: 55 kJ/m^{2}

Thermal properties
- Melting temperature (T_{m}): 343 °C
- Glass transition temperature (T_{g}): 143 °C
- Thermal conductivity (k): 0.25 W/(m⋅K)

Polyether ether ketone (PEEK) is a beige coloured organic thermoplastic polymer in the polyaryletherketone (PAEK) family, used in engineering applications. It was invented in November 1978 and brought to market in the early 1980s by part of Imperial Chemical Industries (ICI), the PEEK division was acquired through a management buyout, giving rise to Victrex PLC.

== Synthesis ==
PEEK polymers are obtained by step-growth polymerization by the dialkylation of bisphenolate salts. Typical is the reaction of 4,4'-difluorobenzophenone with the disodium salt of hydroquinone, which is generated in situ by deprotonation with sodium carbonate. The reaction is conducted around 300 °C in polar aprotic solvents, such as diphenyl sulfone.

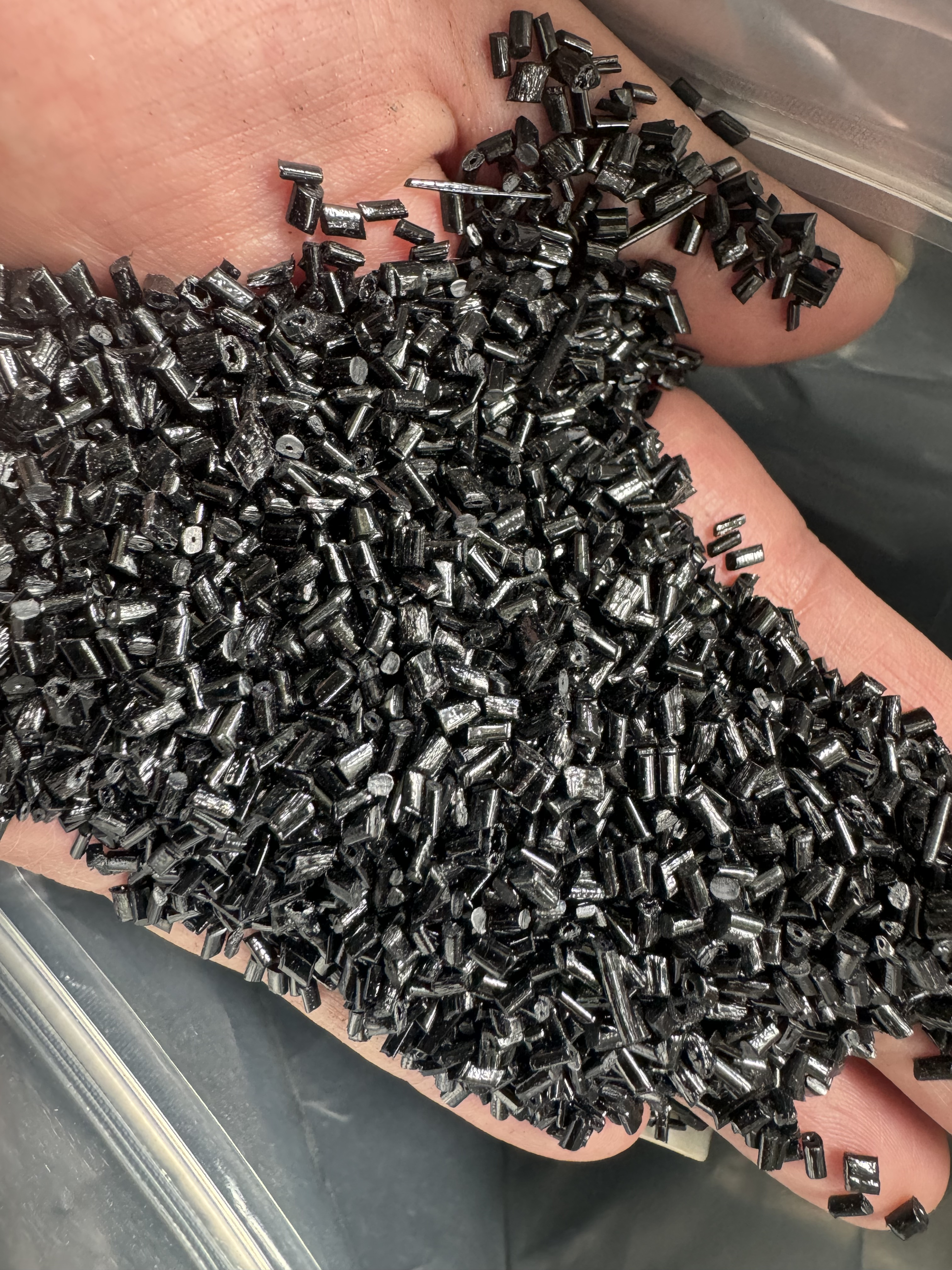
This picture shows thermoplastic PEEK resin

== Properties ==
PEEK is a semicrystalline thermoplastic with excellent mechanical and chemical resistance properties that are retained to high temperatures. The processing conditions used to mould PEEK can influence the crystallinity and hence the mechanical properties. Its Young's modulus is 3.6 GPa and its tensile strength is 90 to 100 MPa. PEEK has a glass transition temperature of around 143 °C (289 °F) and melts around 343 °C (662 °F). Some grades have a useful operating temperature of up to 250 °C (482 °F). The thermal conductivity increases nearly linearly with temperature between room temperature and solidus temperature. It is highly resistant to thermal degradation, as well as to attack by both organic and aqueous environments. It is attacked by halogens and strong Brønsted and Lewis acids, as well as some halogenated compounds and aliphatic hydrocarbons at high temperatures. It is soluble in concentrated sulfuric acid at room temperature, although dissolution can take a very long time unless the polymer is in a form with a high surface-area-to-volume ratio, such as a fine powder or thin film. It has high resistance to biodegradation.

== Applications ==
PEEK is used to fabricate items for demanding applications, including bearings, piston parts, pumps, high-performance liquid chromatography columns, compressor plate valves, and electrical cable insulation. Because of its low moisture uptake, it is one of the few plastics compatible with ultra-high vacuum applications, which makes it suitable for aerospace, automotive, and chemical industries. PEEK is used in medical implants, for example in creating a partial replacement skull in neurosurgical applications.

PEEK is used in spinal fusion devices and reinforcing rods. It is radiolucent, but it is hydrophobic causing it to not fully fuse with bone. PEEK seals and manifolds are commonly used in fluid applications. PEEK also performs well in high temperature applications (up to 260 °C/500 °F). Because of this and its low thermal conductivity, it is also used in fused filament fabrication (FFF) printing to thermally separate the hot end from the cold end.

=== Selection criteria ===
PEEK is selected for applications that require a combination of high temperature resistance, low moisture absorption, dimensional stability, chemical resistance, and wear resistance. These properties make it suitable for components that must operate in harsh thermal, chemical, or mechanical environments, including cases where weight reduction or replacement of metal parts is desirable.

== Processing options ==
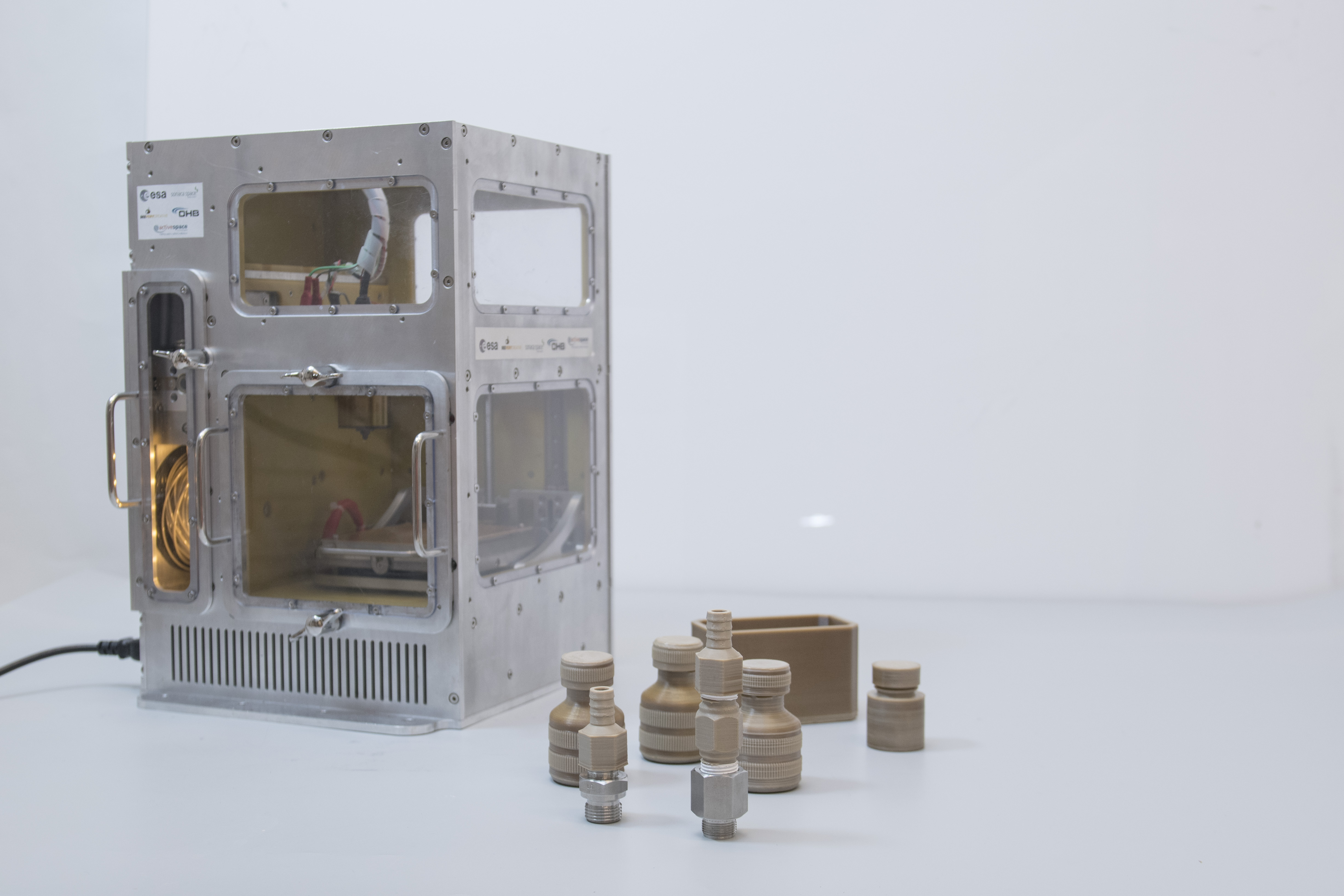
ESA's Manufacturing of Experimental Layer Technology (MELT) FFF 3D printer can print polyether ether ketone (PEEK).

PEEK melts at a relatively high temperature (343 °C / 649.4 °F) compared to most other thermoplastics. In the range of its melting temperature it can be processed using injection moulding or extrusion methods. It is technically feasible to process granular PEEK into filament form and 3D printing parts from the filament material using fused deposition modeling – FDM (or fused filament fabrication – FFF) technology.

In its solid state PEEK is readily machinable, for example, by CNC milling machines and is commonly used to produce high-quality plastic parts that are thermostable and both electrically and thermally insulating. Filled grades of PEEK can also be CNC machined, but special care must be taken to properly manage stresses in the material.

PEEK is a high-performance polymer, but its high price, due to its complex production process, restricts its use to only the most demanding applications.

== Shape-memory PEEK in biomechanical applications ==
PEEK is not traditionally a shape-memory polymer; however, recent advances in processing have allowed shape-memory behaviour in PEEK with mechanical activation. This technology has expanded to applications in orthopaedic surgery.
