= LGBTQ chemicals conspiracy theory =

Anti-LGBTQ conspiracy theory

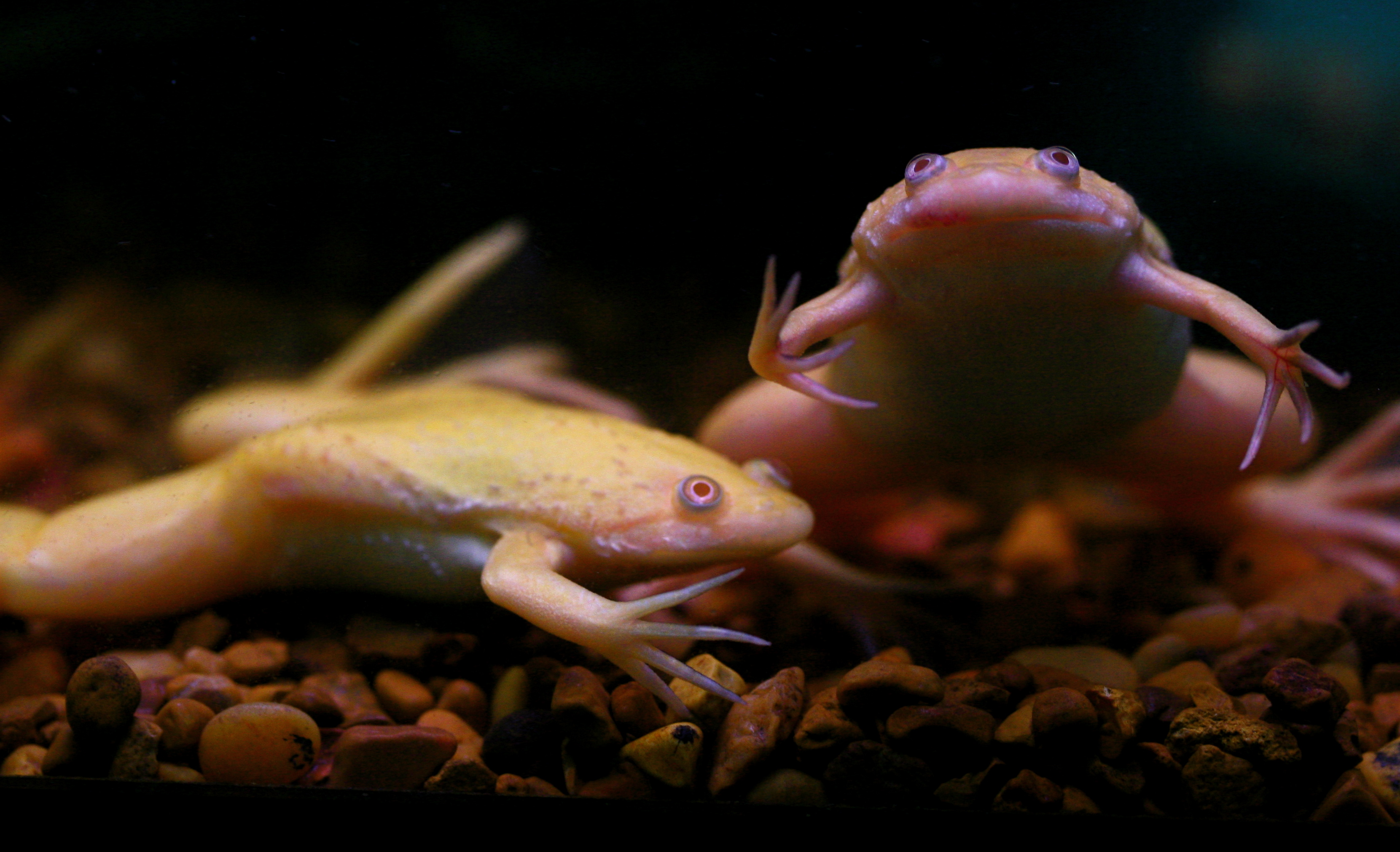
African clawed frog (Xenopus laevis)

Conspiracy theories emerged in the 2010s alleging that governments were introducing endocrine disrupting chemicals into the water supply to increase the lesbian, gay, bisexual, transgender or queer (LGBTQ) population. The claim was popularized by conspiracy theorist Alex Jones, who cited studies on the herbicide atrazine, known to induce spontaneous sex reversal or hermaphroditism in certain frog species, to assert that the U.S. government was "putting chemicals in the water that turn the friggin' frogs gay" as part of a chemical warfare operation. Spontaneous sex change may have occurred in some frog species, even in unpolluted environments.

In animal studies, exposure to endocrine-disrupting chemicals during gestation can interfere with prenatal hormones and consequently sex differentiation of the brain. This has led some scientists to speculate about the impact of endocrine disruptor exposure during human pregnancy on later sexual orientation or gender identity.

== History ==
Animal testing in the 2000s suggested that the herbicide atrazine, an endocrine disruptor, may have a feminizing effect on male frogs, causing them to become hermaphrodites. Other research failed to reproduce these results in frogs, though reports of reproductive impact has been reported for other animals, and a meta-analysis conducted in 2010 on selected amphibians and freshwater fish showed sublethal reproductive effects at ecologically relevant concentrations. Reviewing 19 studies in total, the United States Environmental Protection Agency concluded in 2013 that atrazine has no consistent effects on development in amphibians.

According to Lambert and Packer:

A direct link between EDCs and sex-reversed frogs has been observed only in the laboratory, not in the wild. What's causing sex reversal in these wild frog populations is not yet clear, but our latest data suggest that natural temperature variation, occurring independently of urbanization or climate change, may be a catalyst.

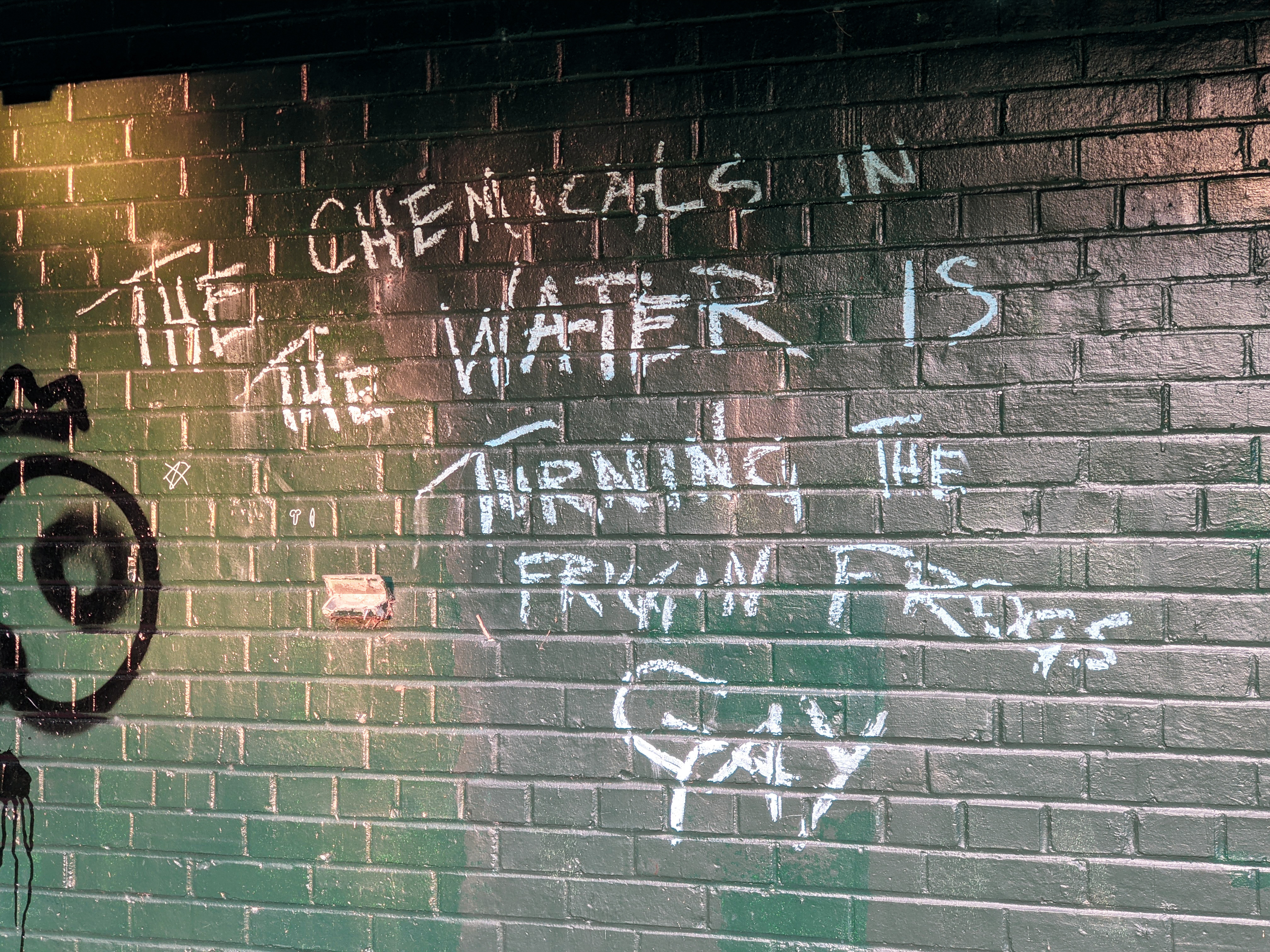
Graffiti in New Orleans citing the Alex Jones quote

In 2015, American conspiracy theorist and radio personality Alex Jones claimed that atrazine had caused a majority of frogs in the U.S. to become homosexual, and that the U.S. government was waging a "chemical warfare operation" to increase rates of homosexuality and decrease birth rates. This claim goes far beyond what was reported in the scientific literature. A quote from Jones's monologue, "I don't like 'em putting chemicals in the water that turn the friggin' frogs gay!" subsequently became an Internet meme.

The idea of a link between atrazine and sexual development was later revived by American environmental lawyer and anti-vaccine activist Robert F. Kennedy Jr., during his 2024 presidential campaign. In various podcast appearances, Kennedy claimed that atrazine contamination was causing widespread delayed puberty or precocious puberty in the Midwest, and speculated that it was causing "sexual confusion" and "gender confusion" in children. On a podcast hosted by the Daily Wire, that was later taken down by YouTube, Kennedy blamed atrazine for causing "sexual dysphoria" in children and claimed that "[i]f it's doing that to frogs, there's a lot of other evidence that it's doing it to human beings as well". Kennedy's theory was criticized in various popular media outlets.

A 2016 review in Psychological Science in the Public Interest argues that there is "no persuasive evidence that the rate of same-sex attraction has varied much across time or place". In contrast to claims about chemicals in the water, the effects of hormones on sexual orientation appear to occur at the prenatal stage, during organization of the brain. Endocrine disruptor exposure during fetal development has been shown to affect sexual differentiation of the brain in animals; however, any effect on human sexual orientation or gender identity requires further research.

== See also ==
- 2020s anti-LGBTQ movement in the United States
- Acquired homosexuality
- Antiandrogens in the environment
- Anti-gender movement
- Anti-LGBTQ rhetoric
- Frogs in culture
- Gay agenda
- Gay bomb
- Health effects of Atrazine
- Pollutant-induced abnormal behaviour
- Sex reversal
- Tyrone Hayes#Atrazine research
