= Hydroxydechloroatrazine ethylaminohydrolase =

Class of enzymes

Identifiers
- EC no.: 3.5.4.43

Databases
- BRENDA: enzyme data
- ExPASy: NiceZyme view
- KEGG: enzyme entry
- MetaCyc: metabolic pathway
- Rhea: reactions
- PDB structures: RCSB PDB PDBe PDBsum
- Gene Ontology: AmiGO / QuickGO
Search
- PMC: articles
- PubMed: articles
- NCBI: proteins

Hydroxydechloroatrazine ethylaminohydrolase (EC 3.5.4.43) is an enzyme characterised from Pseudomonas species that catalyzes the hydrolysis of hydroxyatrazine to N-isopropylammelide and ethylamine:

hydroxyatrazine
H_{2}O
N-isopropylammelide
+ CH_{3}CH_{2}NH_{2}

The reaction is part of the catabolism of the herbicide, atrazine and has been suggested as part of a bioremediation process for such materials. The first step, forming hydroxyatrazine from atrazine, is carried out by atrazine chlorohydrolase.

This enzyme is a hydrolase, one acting on carbon-nitrogen bonds other than peptide bonds, specifically in cyclic amidines. The systematic name of this enzyme class is 4-(ethylamino)-2-hydroxy-6-(isopropylamino)-1,3,5-triazine ethylaminohydrolase. Other names in common use include AtzB, and hydroxyatrazine ethylaminohydrolase.
