= Atrazine chlorohydrolase =

Enzyme

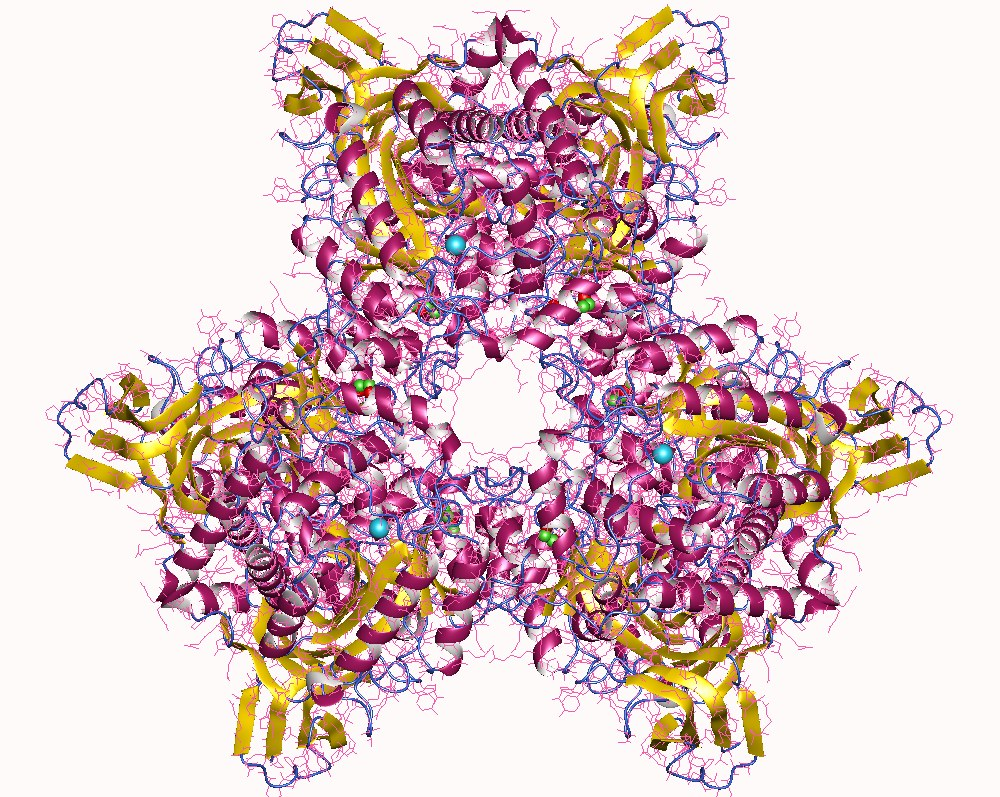
- Atrazine chlorohydrolase hexamer, Pseudomonas sp. adp

Identifiers
- EC no.: 3.8.1.8

Databases
- BRENDA: enzyme data
- ExPASy: NiceZyme view
- KEGG: enzyme entry
- MetaCyc: metabolic pathway
- Rhea: reactions
- PDB structures: RCSB PDB PDBe PDBsum
Search
- PMC: articles
- PubMed: articles
- NCBI: proteins

Atrazine Chlorohydrolase (AtzA) is an enzyme (E.C.3.8.1.8), which catalyzes the conversion of atrazine to hydroxyatrazine. Bacterial degradation determines the environmental impact and efficacy of an herbicide or pesticide. Initially, most pesticides are highly effective and show minimal bacterial degradation; however, bacteria can rapidly evolve and gain the ability to metabolize potential nutrients in the environment. Despite a remarkable structural similarity, degradation of atrazine by bacteria capable of melamine degradation was rare; however, since its introduction as a pesticide in the United States, bacteria capable of atrazine degradation have evolved. Currently, Pseudomonas sp. strain ADP seems to be the optimal bacterial strain for atrazine degradations, which appears to be the sole nitrogen source for the bacteria.

== Reaction ==
AtzA is an atrazine-dechlorinating enzyme with fairly restricted substrate specificity and plays a main role in the hydrolysis of atrazine to hydroxyatrazine in soils and groundwater:

atrazine
H_{2}O
HCl
hydroxyatrazine

AtzA is classified as a hydrolase, acting on halide bonds in C-halide compounds. In 1993, Pseudomonas species strain ADP was shown to degrade atrazine to cyanuric acid via three steps, the first of which is this dechlorination. Subsequent steps are catalysed by hydroxydechloroatrazine ethylaminohydrolase and N-isopropylammelide isopropylaminohydrolase.

== Genetics ==
De Souza, Sadowsky and Wackett were able to determine the nucleotide and amino acid sequence in 1996. This enzyme is 98% identical in amino acid sequence, and in 3-D structure, to melamine deaminase but functionally different catalyzing the degradation of different substrates. The gene coding for the enzyme shows 99% similarity between bacteria. In fact there is only a 9-nucleotide difference, directly corresponding to the amino acid differences. The nucleotide differences are unlikely to cause a conformational change in the enzyme but rather site-specific alterations. This seems logical considering the remarkable similarity in the substrates and the relatively short period of evolution.

== Specificity ==
AtzA was shown to displace fluoride as well as chlorine but not azido, cyano, methoxy, which are of similar size and electronegativity, or thiomethyl or amino groups. The inability of AtzA to perform deamination makes it unique within its superfamily, amidohydrolases. Furthermore, atrazine is not degraded by melamine deaminase and it does not inhibit melamine deaminase activity suggesting the active site is not specific for atrazine.
