= Gay bomb =

Hypothetical psychochemical weapon

"Gay bomb" is an informal term referring to a proposed non-lethal psychochemical weapon that was speculated by the United States Air Force in the 1990s. The concept involved dispersing sex pheromones to induce mutual sexual attraction among enemy soldiers, with the intention of causing confusion and disrupting military cohesion.

Dating back to 1994, the Wright Laboratory in Ohio, a precursor to the modern United States Air Force Research Laboratory, drafted a three-page proposal detailing several potential nonlethal chemical weapons. This document, eventually acquired by the Sunshine Project via a Freedom of Information Act request, explores the notion of the "gay bomb" among other concepts.

The Pentagon did not deny that the proposal had been made, stating its commitment for researching non-lethal weapons for military use. Critics, such as Aaron Belkin, director of the University of California's Michael Palm Center, called the idea "ludicrous" for thinking that an aerosol could possibly change people into homosexuals.

== Background ==
No well-controlled scientific studies have ever been published suggesting the possibility of pheromones causing rapid behavioral changes in humans.

Some body spray advertisers claim that their products contain human sex pheromones which act as an aphrodisiac. In the 1970s, "copulins" were patented as products which release human pheromones, based on research on rhesus monkeys. Subsequently, androstenone, axillary sweat, and "vomodors" have been claimed to act as human pheromones.

Despite these claims, no pheromonal substance has ever been demonstrated to directly influence human behavior in a peer-reviewed study.

Using a brain imaging technique, Swedish researchers have shown that when homosexual and heterosexual males are presented with two odors that may be involved in sexual arousal, their brains tend to respond differently—the homosexual men tend to respond in the same way as heterosexual women, though it could not be determined whether this was a causal relationship. The study was expanded to include homosexual women; the results were consistent with previous findings meaning that homosexual women were not as responsive to male-identified odors, while their response to female cues was similar to that of heterosexual males. According to the researchers, this research suggests a possible role for human pheromones in the biological basis of sexual orientation.

== Leaked documents ==
In both of the documents, the possibility was canvassed that a strong aphrodisiac could be dropped on enemy troops, ideally one which would also cause "homosexual behavior". The documents described the aphrodisiac weapon as "distasteful but completely non-lethal".

== Ig Nobel Prize awards ==
Wright Laboratory won the satiric 2007 Ig Nobel Peace Prize for "instigating research & development on a chemical weapon—the so-called 'gay bomb'—that will make enemy soldiers become sexually irresistible to each other."

== See also ==
- 30 Rock, a sitcom which featured a working gay bomb in the episode "Cooter".
- Bremelanotide, the only known synthetic aphrodisiac
- Brickleberry, a sitcom whose sixth episode, "Gay Bomb", involves a gay bomb.
- Frey effect (science)
- Misattribution of arousal
- Sacred Band of Thebes, an ancient elite unit of male lovers
- The Alex Jones Show, a far-right talk show whose host Alex Jones has referenced the concept of gay bombs in segments speaking about the LGBT chemicals conspiracy theory
