= Xenohormone =

Group of compounds showing endocrine hormone-like properties

Xenohormones or environmental hormones are compounds produced outside of the human body that exhibit endocrine hormone-like properties. They may be either of natural origin, such as phytoestrogens, which are derived from plants, or of synthetic origin. These compounds can cause endocrine disruption by multiple mechanisms including acting directly on hormone receptors, affecting the levels of natural hormones in the body, and by altering the expression of hormone receptors. The most commonly occurring xenohormones are xenoestrogens, which mimic the effects of estrogen. Other xenohormones include xenoandrogens (anabolic-androgenic steroids) and xenoprogesterones. Xenohormones are used for a variety of purposes including contraceptive & hormonal therapies, and agriculture. However, exposure to certain xenohormones early in childhood development can lead to a host of developmental issues including infertility, thyroid complications, and early onset of puberty. Exposure to others later in life has been linked to increased risks of testicular, prostate, ovarian, and uterine cancers.

== Etymology ==
The term is derived from the Greek words ξένος (xenos), meaning "stranger". The prefix "xeno-" is added because xenohormones are foreign to the body, even though they mimic natural hormones.

== Sources ==
Xenohormones can come from a variety of sources, both natural and man-made. Man-made xenoestrogens are often found in cosmetic products, some foods, certain pharmaceuticals, plastic products, flame retardants, and pesticides. Naturally occurring xenoestrogens include phytoestrogens (estrogen-like compounds from plants) and mycoestrogens (estrogen-like compounds from fungi).

While natural xenohormones exist, there are not as many compounds found in nature which are capable of interacting with human androgen receptors, so humans are most likely to come into contact with man-made xenoandrogens by taking anabolic steroids or through pollutants which contain xenoandrogens. "Organochlorine pesticides, polychlorinated biphenyls (PCBs), and polychlorinated dibenzo-p-dioxins/dibenzofurans (PCDDs/PCDFs)" are several pesticides known to contain xenoandrogens.

Xenohormones are found in a variety of different consumer products, agricultural products, and chemicals. Common sources of xenohormones include:

Contraceptives and Hormone Therapies
Xenohormones and xenoestrogens are commonly used in oral contraceptives such as birth control pills and hormone replacement therapies due to their similarities to natural hormones.

There are many alternatives to prevent pregnancy to stop using oral contraceptives that use xenohormones such as Dropspirenone and Ethinyl Estroidal. Non-hormonal birth control includes, but not subject to the use of a: diaphragm, cervical cap, sponge, copper IUD, spermicide, vaginal gel, male condom, and female condom.

Agriculture
Synthetic estrogenic drugs such as the bovine growth hormone (BVG) are commonly used to increase the size of cattle and maximize the amount of meat and dairy product that can come from them. Xenohormones are also found in certain pesticides, herbicides, and fungicides.
Plastics
Xenohormones are found in almost all plastics, and they appear in many consumer products that use plastic elements or plastic packaging. Common xenohormones in plastics and other industrial compounds include BPA, Phthalates, PVC, and PCBs. These can be found in several household items, including plastic dishes and utensils, Styrofoam, cling wrap, flooring, toys, and other items containing plastic or plasticizers. In 2000, the FDA banned the use of phthalates in baby toys due to health concerns.
Cleaning and Cosmetic Products
Many household products can contain certain xenohormones, including laundry detergent, fabric softeners, soap, shampoo, toothpaste, makeup and cosmetic products, feminine hygiene products.

== Endocrinology ==
When present in excessive amounts in the human body, xenohormones can cause a host of health issues due to their disruption of the endocrine system. The name given to these exogenous (coming from an external source) hormones is endocrine disruptors, due to their tendency to mimic the behaviors of naturally produced bodily hormones. Endocrine disruptors have also been found to affect the levels and behaviors of a number of other bodily hormones. Because of this, it is difficult to establish a definitive relationship between xenohormones and health problems, making effects hard to predict.

Xenohormones pose a problem because they are retained by the body in fat tissue for a very long time. As we are exposed more and more to these chemicals, they build up within the body in ever-increasing amounts, a process known as bioaccumulation. With the amount of xenohormones we are exposed to every day, the health effects of xenohormones are becoming more relevant.

The human body's endocrine system functions through hormones that act as messengers within the body. Hormones, upon release, travel through the body to their receptors and trigger a physiological response. Hormones naturally work at very low concentrations in the body. This means that even low concentrations of xenohormones in the body can act as an excess and have a profound effect on the body's endocrine system.

The levels of hormones present in the body at any given time are tightly controlled through feedback mechanisms. When xenohormones are present in the body, they alter the levels of hormones in the body and therefore alter the feedback mechanisms that the endocrine system relies on.

Xenohormones can interact with the human endocrine system because they are structurally similar to natural hormones. This similarity allows for xenohormones to act on hormone receptors, usually either as an agonist or antagonist. Agonists activate a receptor by binding to the receptor, enhancing the effect of the natural hormone. Antagonists inhibit the activation of a receptor by preventing the binding of the natural hormone to its receptor. In this way, xenohormones act as endocrine disruptors by increasing or decreasing the activation of hormone receptors in the body.

Xenohormones can often act on multiple hormone receptor types and enact multiple different effects. For example, BPA acts as an agonist of estrogen receptors and as an antagonist of androgen receptors. Methoxychlor is an organochlorine pesticide that can act on both estrogen receptors and androgen receptors.

Other than having effects by directly acting on the endocrine receptors, xenohormones can also act to decrease the availability of natural hormones. Phthalates inhibit testosterone synthesis and decrease the production of natural androgens in the body. Dioxins and some organochlorine pesticides (OCPs) can cause increased metabolism of estrogen, decreasing the amount of estrogen in the body. Xenohormones can also alter the expression of hormone receptors to either increase or decrease the amount of receptors available in tissues.

When xenohormone exposure occurs during the early developmental stages of life, the effects tend to be permanent. The consequences of excessive xenohormone exposure in adulthood are different, and typically more temporary in nature. This is to say that the health risks can be minimized if the individual is removed from their state of excessive exposure. Xenohormone-related issues in adults frequently take the form of increased cancer risk in reproductive/secondary sexual areas (breast, uterine, ovarian, prostate, and testicular).

=== Xenoestrogens ===
Xenoestrogens are xenohormones that mimic the effects of natural estrogen. When present in the body, xenoestrogens can bind with estrogen receptors in the brain, leading to a disruption in the gonadal endocrine system.

Xenoestrogen exposure during different developmental periods can have differing effects on the reproductive system. Prenatal and perinatal exposure results in greater reproductive defects than exposure in adult life.

The negative effects of excessive xenoestrogen involve a long list of developmental abnormalities, especially when the exposure occurs during a critical postnatal period. When high levels of xenoestrogen are experienced shortly after birth, urogenital tract and nervous system development are hindered, as they are known to be especially sensitive to hormonal disruption.

Known xenoestrogens include bisphenol A (BPA), the organochlorine pesticide methoxychlor, and the insecticide endosulfan.

=== Xenoandrogens ===
Xenoandrogens are xenohormones that mimic the effects of natural androgen hormones. Androgen hormones are often associated with males and include the major hormone testosterone. Androgens work on the metabolic system playing roles in muscle growth, bone formation, and endocrine function.

There are not many compounds found in nature that are capable of interacting with human androgen receptors, so humans are most likely to come into contact with man-made xenoandrogens by taking anabolic steroids or through pollutants that contain xenoandrogens. Organochlorine pesticides, polychlorinated biphenyls (PCBs), and polychlorinated dibenzo-p-dioxins/dibenzofurans (PCDDs/PCDFs) are several pesticides known to contain xenoandrogens.

== Effect on humans ==
Research indicates that exposure to certain xenohormones can result in severe health risks, including infertility, early onset puberty, thyroid problems, endometriosis, and certain types of cancers. The effect that xenohormones have on the health of humans is complex with a wide range and can effect multiple systems and process within the human body. It has also been claimed that certain xenoestrogens, most notably phytoestrogens and mycoestrogens can potentially have beneficial health effects, though it is not yet clear to what extent the benefits are present or whether they outweigh the possible health risks of these compounds. Xenohormones and other endocrine disrupting compounds (EDCs) can block and disrupt the natural function of hormones and the functionality of endocrine system in the human body, so conditions related to hormone imbalance or an improperly functioning endocrine system are possible after exposure. The specific risk that a xenohormone has on a person is based on the exposure level and their biological make up. There has been difficult comprehensive research on the specific outcomes on the relationship of xenohormone exposure and its effect on the health of humans. There have also been research on ways to mitigate the risk and its threats to public health like the development of a biomarker to identify and measure the level of xenohormones in blood to approximate the level of exposure.

=== Males ===
Xenohormones can negatively impact the reproductive health of men by disrupting their hormone levels and sperm production which leads to reduced fertility. There is also an increased rate of prostate cancer or prostate related disorders in males due to xenohormone exposure. There are also studies done on how during certain stages of development xenohormone exposure can effect sexual maturation and the development of secondary sexual characteristics in males.

=== Females ===
Xenohormones can have a negative impact on the reproductive health of females by disrupting their hormone levels and the natural flow of their menstrual cycles. This disruption can lead to miscarriages, fertility problems, and irregular ovulation. Hormone imbalances in females caused by xenohormones caused health issues like thyroid cancer and polyendocrine metabolic ovarian syndrome (PMOS). There is also an increased risk on breast cancer or breast related disorders depending onto length of exposure to xenohormones. In older women going through menopause the exposure to xenohormones can cause a dramatic increase in their menopausal symptoms from hot flashed to severe mood swings.

=== Cancer risk ===
Researchers suspect that xenohormones promotes the growth of cancer by causing aboral cell growth and playing a role in altering hormone levels. Certain xenohormones have been detected in the breast tissue of humans with breast cancer, which hints at a correlation between xenoestrogen exposure and breast cancer. This can occur in both men and women, although women may be more likely to develop breast cancer from xenohormones due to the popularity of cosmetic products that contain endocrine disruptors among women. It is also important to note that it may also be the case that women simply develop breast cancer in general more often than men, as there is no conclusive evidence that xenoestrogen-related breast cancers are more common among women than men after adjusting for the differing rates of breast cancer. Xenohormones are also linked to increased risks of susceptibility to testicular, prostate, ovarian, and uterine cancers.

=== Prenatal effects ===
Several women treated with xenoestrogens while pregnant showed signs an effect to the central nervous system of their offspring leading to them having psychiatric/somatic disorders. There was a significant amount of offspring treated with xenohormones during the prenatal period that showed an alteration of genes will lead to psychosis and other psychiatric disorders during their neurodevelopment. The primary part of the brain affected by the prenatal xenohormone exposure to the offspring and mother were the hippocampus and amygdala. There was also evidence of autism spectrum disorders and learning disabilities in addition to the mood and behavior disorders found in the offspring of mothers treated with xenohormones. The effects found to be transgenerational so that if the offspring grew to have children as an adult the alternation of genes caused by xenohormones in the offspring carry over to future offspring for multiple generations.

== Environmental risks ==
The use of xenohormones in both agriculture and industry raises concerns about their effect on the environment and public health. Xenohormones have been observed to contaminate food and water through the use of pesticides, hormone treatments in livestock, and plastic packing such as water bottles.

=== Wildlife ===
In addition to posing health threats for humans, EDCs in the environment also pose health risks to wildlife. Common source of EDCs in the environment are agricultural pesticides, which are often effective due to their effects on the endocrine systems of pest species. A well known example of a xenohormone having detrimental effects on wildlife is the pesticide xenoestrogen DDT, which causes reproductive defects in birds and can persist in the environment, leading to bioaccumulation in the food chain. However, it can be difficult to accurately measure the effects of EDCs on the environment, as the extent of the influence a compound can have on an organism can vary across taxa. Pesticides which affect the endocrine system of a target species can have led to unintended effects on other species. For example, PCBs can interrupt animal fetal development, cause changes in an animal's response to stress, and cause thyroid and immune function diseases. Plastics specifically pose a commendable environment threat due to the fact that many of them do not decompose. Xenohormones in plastic litter have the potential to contaminate natural water sources and expose both humans and wildlife to a variety of different EDCs.

=== Regulations ===
Regulations on the use of xenohormone-containing substances vary by country. In the United States, the Endocrine Disruptor Screening and Testing Advisory Committee was formed in 1996 and developed the Endocrine Disruptor Screening Program (EDSP). The EDSP is used by the EPA and other regulatory bodies to screen chemicals such as pesticides and potential environmental pollutants for their effects on the endocrine systems of humans and wildlife. Because xenohormones such as BPA have demonstrated health concerns for humans and animals, both the Environmental Protection Agency (EPA) and FDA have conducted research and issued statements and regulations to reduce their impact on public health and the environment. In March 2010, the EPA published its Bisphenol A (BPA) Action Plan, which details measures to reduce the impact of BPA on aquatic species. Under this action plan, the EPA is considering listing BPA as a substance that may present a significant risk to the environment on the Toxic Substances Control Act Concern List. The EU banned pesticides from containing EDCs in the passage of the 2009 Plant Protection Products Regulation as well as the 2012 Biocidal Products Regulation.

== See also ==
- Xenobiotic
- Xenoestrogen
- Anabolic steroid
- Bisphenol A
