= Cooter (30 Rock) =

- 30 Rock episode
- Episode no.: Season 2 Episode 15
- Directed by: Don Scardino
- Written by: Tina Fey
- Cinematography by: Vanja Černjul
- Production code: 215
- Original air date: May 8, 2008

Guest appearances
- Matthew Broderick as Cooter Burger; Kevin Brown as Dot Com Slattery; Grizz Chapman as Grizz Griswold; Edie Falco as C. C. Cunningham; David Forsyth as Congressman #1; Maulik Pancholy as Jonathan; Paul Scheer as Donny Lawson; Dean Winters as Dennis Duffy; Teller as Guy Who Brings the Pens (cameo)

Episode chronology
← Previous "Sandwich Day"	Next → "Do-Over"
- 30 Rock season 2

"Cooter" is the fifteenth and final episode of the second season of 30 Rock and the thirty-sixth episode of the series. It was written by series' creator Tina Fey and was directed by one of the season's producers, Don Scardino. The episode first aired on May 8, 2008, on the NBC network in the United States. "Cooter" follows Jack Donaghy's (Alec Baldwin) attempt to get fired from his new job in politics; Liz Lemon's (Fey) pregnancy scare and decision to adopt a baby; Tracy Jordan's (Tracy Morgan) creation of a pornographic video game; and Kenneth Parcell's (Jack McBrayer) aspiration to be an NBC page at the Beijing Olympics. The episode is an unofficial season finale, due to the season being shortened by the 2007–2008 Writers Guild of America strike.

"Cooter" received positive reviews from critics, and several considered it to be among the series' best episodes. Several critics noted that Liz had a pregnancy scare the same week that Fey's film Baby Mama was released, possibly used as cross promotion. The episode was watched by 5.61 million American viewers on its original broadcast, and was nominated for two awards, winning one.

== Plot ==
Jack gets a job in politics as the "Homeland Security Director for Crisis and Weather Management"; however, it is not what he expected. When he learns that Don Geiss (Rip Torn), the CEO of General Electric, said "Jackie Boy" while in his coma, he schemes with another government employee, Cooter Burger (Matthew Broderick), to get fired after his letter of resignation is rejected. Jack also enlists the help of Celeste "C. C." Cunningham (Edie Falco), his Congresswoman (D-VT) ex-girlfriend, to approve research into a "gay bomb". Jack hopes that the bomb, an old Pentagon project that is expensive, inefficient and offensive to "both the red states and the gayer blue states", will ultimately result in their dismissal.

Meanwhile, Liz thinks she may be pregnant and is horrified when she discovers it is most likely the baby of her ex-boyfriend, Dennis Duffy (Dean Winters). After several pregnancy tests, she tells a visiting Jack that the positive tests are a result of her eating "Sabor de Soledad" ('Taste of Loneliness' in Spanish) cheese puffs, which contain bull semen. Nevertheless, she tells Jack that she is ready to have a child and wants to adopt. Kenneth learns of an opportunity to be an NBC page at the Beijing Olympics, however, head page Donny Lawson (Paul Scheer) tries to make sure that he does not submit his essay on time. Jenna Maroney (Jane Krakowski) helps him complete his essay, but Donny stalls Kenneth by forcing him to deliver paper. This begins a sequence which references several Summer Olympic events. Pete shoots Donny in the leg with an arrow (archery), dressed in his gear from when he was an Olympic archer. Kenneth then goes through a series of obstacles themed to different Summer Olympic events. He begins by running and jumping over a "Wet Floor" sign (low hurdles) and then an airplane chair prop carried by two men (high hurdles). Kenneth next grabs a bamboo pole and runs with it, using it to push the button on the elevator before throwing it to another page (likely pole vault, but possibly javelin throw). He then does a forward flip into the elevator, ending with him standing and saluting to the back and front of the elevator (gymnastics/floor routine). Finally, Kenneth makes it to the 27th floor only to see his way blocked by workmen painting. As an executive opens the door to the NBC Olympic Headquarters, Kenneth spins and throws his application pack through the closing door (discus). He finally runs forward a few feet to break the blue painter's tape and collapse victorious, then throws up (sprint). Tracy's invention, the world's first pornographic video game, is nearly complete. He gives Frank, who has helped him, the prototype copy of the game.

The episode shows what happens three months later, in August 2008. Jack and Cooter present their "gay bomb" to the Pentagon, which works only in enclosed areas, making it useless in combat. However, Cooter accidentally breaks the vial, causing everybody in the room, including Vice President Dick Cheney, to "feel weird". Frank emerges from his office after playing Tracy's game non-stop for three months, not realizing the amount of time that has passed. While in Beijing, Kenneth gets involved with a Chinese woman who wants his kidneys. The last part was said in Mandarin without subtitles, leaving the English-speaking audience unaware of Kenneth's trouble.

The conversation roughly translates as:
Lady: "Kenneth, I like you, because I am attracted to your two healthy kidneys."
Kenneth: "What?"
(Man breaks down the door with gun drawn)
Kenneth: "I had no idea!"

The conversation in Mandarin: Lady: Kenneth, 我喜欢你，因为我看上了你那两个健壮的肾。
Kenneth: 什么？
(Man breaks down the door with gun drawn)
Kenneth: 真没想到！

== Production ==
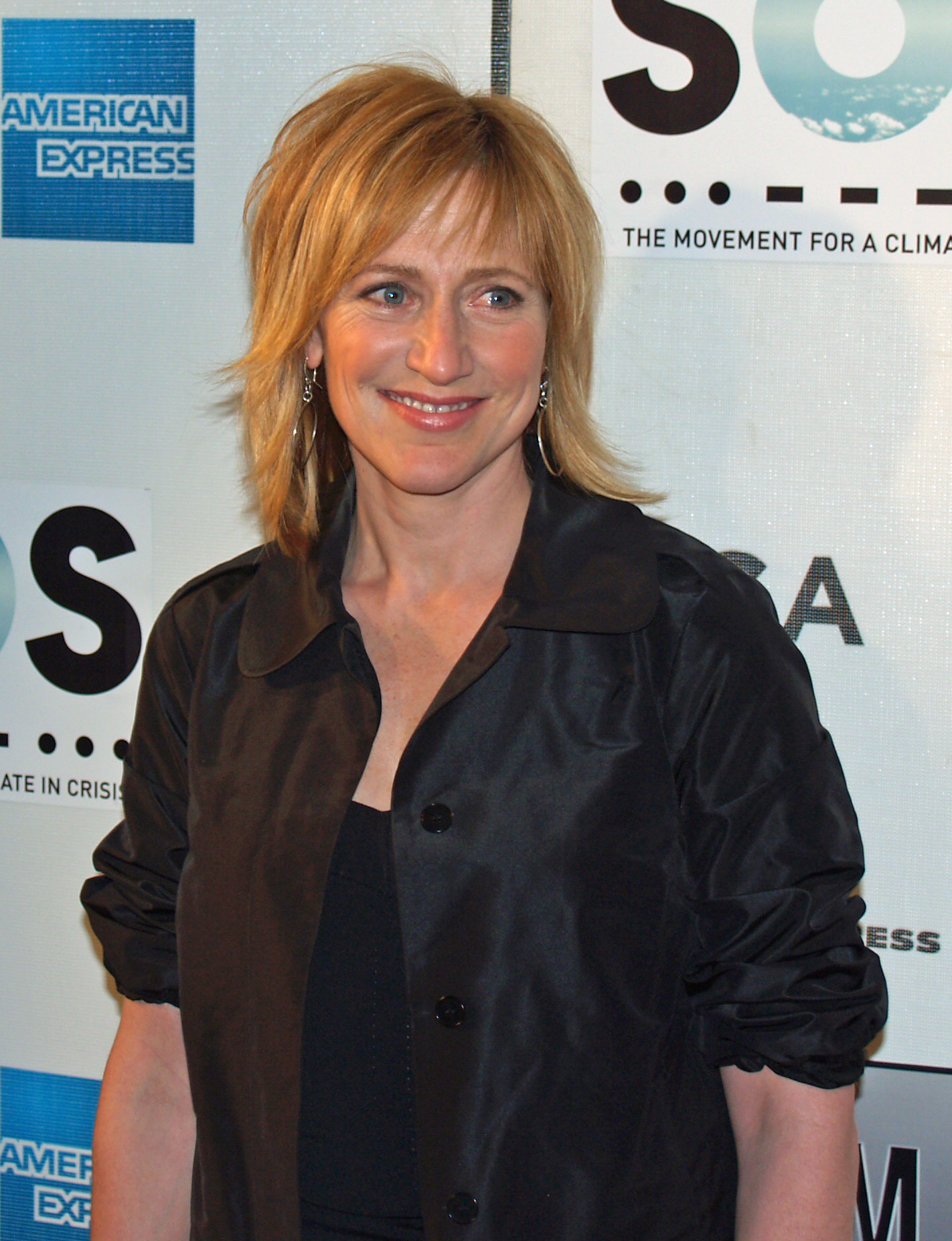
Edie Falco enjoyed working with the cast of 30 Rock.

The title of the episode is one of Fey's favorite words, which she used multiple times when she appeared as an anchor on the Saturday Night Live sketch Weekend Update. Fey explains that she likes the word because "it's one of the least graphic ways to describe the female genitals". This episode marks the final appearance of Edie Falco, who was hired for a three-episode arc. Falco made her debut in the episode "Somebody to Love" as Celeste Cunningham, a Congresswoman and romantic interest of Jack's. She appeared in "Secrets and Lies", where James Carville helps the fledgling relationship. The pair breaks up in Episode 210, when they realize their careers prevent them from staying together. Falco said that she was "thrilled for the opportunity to work with such great comic actors", and expressed her enjoyment of watching the series. Fey was "thrilled to have such an amazing actress come join us", and joked that "a lot of guys on our crew want The Sopranos ending explained to them", in which Falco was a series star.

== Reception ==
"Cooter" was watched by 5.6 million viewers, and received a 2.6 rating and 7 share in the 18–49 demographic. The 2.6 refers to 2.6% of all 18- to 49-year-olds in the U.S., and the 7 refers to 7% of all 18- to 49-year-olds watching television in the U.S. at the time of the broadcast. By comparison CBS's CSI was viewed by 17.82 million viewers, ABC's Grey's Anatomy received 15.60 million viewers, Fox's Don't Forget the Lyrics! received 6.22 million viewers, and The CW's Supernatural received 2.53 million viewers. The finale was watched by 206,000 more viewers than the previous episode.

Terry Morrow of the Knoxville News Sentinel said that, although 30 Rock is struggling to find viewers, this "tiny show [...] shines with absolute brilliance", and judged "Cooter" as one of its best episodes. He speculated that the lack of viewers might have been because the show had failed to create an emotional bond with its audience, despite its being "happy to be a very witty sitcom". He felt the entire cast was "spot on", but singled out Jane Krakowski for her "scene-stealing" moments when she revealed the art of backhanded compliments. Verne Gay of Newsday praised Jenna's and Kenneth's storylines, and liked the cameo by Broderick, stating his "comic chops [were] on full display". Robert Canning of IGN praised Kenneth's and Tracy's storylines, and described Tracy's voice-recording session for his porn video game as "thank-goodness-this-is-airing-later-than-8:30". Alan Sepinwall of The Star-Ledger felt that the "nearly-perfect" episode was marred by Kenneth's page-rivalry, which "didn't work". Time called "Cooter" the eighth-best episode of 2008.

Mark A. Perigard of the Boston Herald felt that "Cooter" was one of the best episodes of 30 Rock's shortened season, with something for everyone in the ensemble cast to do. He noted that Fey's character, Liz, has a pregnancy scare the same week that Fey's film, Baby Mama, was in theaters, asking "How much mama drama does Tina Fey think viewers want?" Bob Sassone of TV Squad originally thought the episode might have been secretly cross promoting Baby Mama, but ultimately decided against this judgment. Jeff Labrecque of Entertainment Weekly was disappointed that Liz was not actually pregnant, and hoped that her former boyfriend, Dennis, would continue to reappear in the next season. Oscar Dahl of BuddyTV speculated that the episode may have been hinting at Alec Baldwin's real-life political plans. (He was considering running for office.)

The episode was nominated for Primetime Emmy Awards, winning one. Tina Fey won for Outstanding Writing for a Comedy Series, and Ken Eluto was nominated for Outstanding Single-Camera Picture Editing for a Comedy Series.
