= N-isopropylammelide isopropylaminohydrolase =

Class of enzymes

Identifiers
- EC no.: 3.5.4.42

Databases
- BRENDA: enzyme data
- ExPASy: NiceZyme view
- KEGG: enzyme entry
- MetaCyc: metabolic pathway
- Rhea: reactions
- PDB structures: RCSB PDB PDBe PDBsum
- Gene Ontology: AmiGO / QuickGO
Search
- PMC: articles
- PubMed: articles
- NCBI: proteins

N-isopropylammelide isopropylaminohydrolase (EC 3.5.4.42) is an enzyme that catalyzes the hydrolysis of N-isopropylammelide to cyanuric acid and isopropylamine:

N-isopropylammelide
H_{2}O
cyanuric acid
+ (CH_{2})_{2}CHNH_{2}

The reaction is part of the catabolism of the herbicide, atrazine and has been suggested as part of a bioremediation process for such materials.

This enzyme is a hydrolase, one acting on carbon-nitrogen bonds other than peptide bonds, specifically in cyclic amidines. The systematic name of this enzyme class is N-isopropylammelide isopropylaminohydrolase. It is also called AtzC.

== Structural studies ==
As of late 2007, only one structure has been solved for this class of enzymes, with the PDB accession code PDB: 2QT3.
