= Pollutant-induced abnormal behaviour =

Behavioural characteristics caused by pollution

Pollutant-induced abnormal behaviour refers to the abnormal behaviour induced by pollutants. Chemicals released into the natural environment by humans impact the behaviour of a wide variety of animals. The main culprits are endocrine-disrupting chemicals (EDCs), which mimic, block, or interfere with animal hormones. A new research field, integrative behavioural ecotoxicology, is emerging. However, chemical pollutants are not the only anthropogenic offenders. Noise and light pollution also induce abnormal behaviour.

This topic is of special concern for its conservation and human health implications and has been studied greatly by animal behaviourists, environmental toxicologists, and conservation scientists. Behaviours serve as potential indicators for ecological health. Behaviour can be more sensitive to EDCs than developmental and physiological traits, and it was the behaviour of eagles that first drew attention to the now well-known dangers of DDT. However, behaviour is generally difficult to measure and can be highly variable.

Behaviours which are critical for survival, such as reproductive and social behaviours, and cognitive abilities like learning can be affected directly or indirectly by chemical pollutants— many examples have been documented, and their chemical culprits have been identified. These same behaviours can also be altered by anthropogenic noise and light, although their mechanisms are relatively unknown.

== EDCs known to alter behaviour ==
- Atrazine - a common herbicide
- Bisphenol A - component of some plastics
- Carbaryl
- Cypermethrin - a common insecticide
- DDT
- DEHP
- Dioxins and dioxin-like compounds
- Endosulfan
- Fenarimol - a common fungicide
- Fenitrothion
- Kepone
- Lead compounds
- Mercury compounds
- Methoxychlor
- Nonylphenol
- PCBs
- Vinclozolin
- 17β-trenbolone

Determining the link between such pollutants and altered behaviours often requires both field studies and laboratory studies. Field studies are useful in determining whether behavioural changes appear with pollution levels occurring in the environment, while laboratory studies can be used to clarify the mechanisms connecting an environmental pollutant to specific behavioural changes.

== Mechanisms ==
EDCs affect the synthesis, storage, release, transport, clearance, receptor recognition, binding, or post-receptor responses of hormones. This results in either stimulative or inhibitive effects, resulting in overproduction or underproduction of hormones. The effects of hormones on behaviour have been well studied, and often produce direct behavioural effects by acting on the central nervous system. Indirectly, behaviours may be altered by hormones influencing an animal's metabolism or other important processes.

Since behaviours also influence hormones, chemical pollutants that induce behavioural changes may also affect hormone levels, which could result in more behavioural or other changes.

== Applying Tinbergen's four questions ==
Studies into the mechanisms underlying behavioural adjustments fall into a category of animal behaviour research described by Tinbergen.

Studies of animal behaviour typically pertain to one of Tinbergen's four questions, and these can be applied to studies regarding chemical pollution. Questions of causation focus on how pollutant-exposure disrupts the mechanisms behind normal behaviour. For example, when differences in sexual behaviours were noted in wildlife after the introduction of DDT, biochemical experiments on rats were able to show that the pollutant was inhibiting androgen binding to androgen receptors.

Secondly, questions of ontogeny consider how exposure disrupts the development of behaviours. An example is when researchers examined the effects of an aerosol on the spatial learning of mice. Thirdly, questions of adaptation consider how behavioural modifications resulting from exposure will influence fitness. Scientists have investigated the reproductive success of white ibises exposed to methylmercury, for instance. Lastly, questions of phylogeny consider how phylogenetic history might predetermine sensitivity or resistance to pollutants in a particular behaviour. This could include investigating how animals that are better at learning might be better at avoiding toxins in the environment.

== Effects on reproductive behaviours ==
Reproductive behaviour effects may involve changes in courtship and mating behaviours, mate choice, or changes in nest building. Most studies on this topic have been conducted on fish and birds. For example, treating adult male zebra fish with biphenol A for 7 weeks resulted in decreased courtship behaviour of females. 17β-trenbolone exposure in adult guppies and mosquitofish also altered female mate selection, as they preferred unexposed males. Guppies treated with atrazine during breeding and through gestation were less likely to engage in and showed fewer numbers of courtship displays and other reproductive behaviours. Additionally, females preferred untreated males.

Studies on birds show significant effects of EDCs on mating songs and displays. For example, treating female zebra finches with PCBs before egg laying resulted in a size reduction in the song centres of the chick's brains. Methylmercury exposure at environmental levels for 3 years in male white ibises resulted in increased homosexual behaviour, decreased rates of key courtship behaviours, and less attractiveness to females. Mammals are also susceptible, and effects on individuals have been shown to have transgenerational and even population-level consequences. Illustrating this, female rats three generations removed from vinclozolin exposure show changes in mate preference, preferring unexposed mates, while male rats do not, and this could have complex effects on the population.

== Conservation implications ==
Chemical-induced changes in animal behaviour often have consequences for wild populations. The effects of concern aren't limited to reproductive effects, which have obvious implications for population vitality. For example, frogs exposed to pesticide-levels found in the environment demonstrate hyperactivity, whip-like convulsions, and depressed avoidance behaviour, which may increase their vulnerability to predation.

As well, guppies from crude oil-polluted environments are less exploratory after both short-term and long-term exposure. This may weaken their foraging efficiency and resource-use diversity, thus posing a threat to the population viability. This topic is therefore quite important for understanding how human-impacts on the environment may threaten populations. Additionally, if abnormal behaviours can be used as indicators of toxic pollution, then this provides a much more accessible mode of toxicology science. Therefore, there is potential for engaging citizen scientists in environmental research.

== Noise and light pollution ==
Pollutants are not always chemicals. They can be other unnatural stimuli introduced to the environment by humans, such as noise and light pollution. Anthropogenic noise and light can result in altered antipredator behaviour, reproductive behaviour, communication, foraging behaviour, population distribution, male-male competition and more. However, the mechanisms behind these altered behaviours is relatively unknown within the literature.

=== Noise pollution ===
==== Birds ====
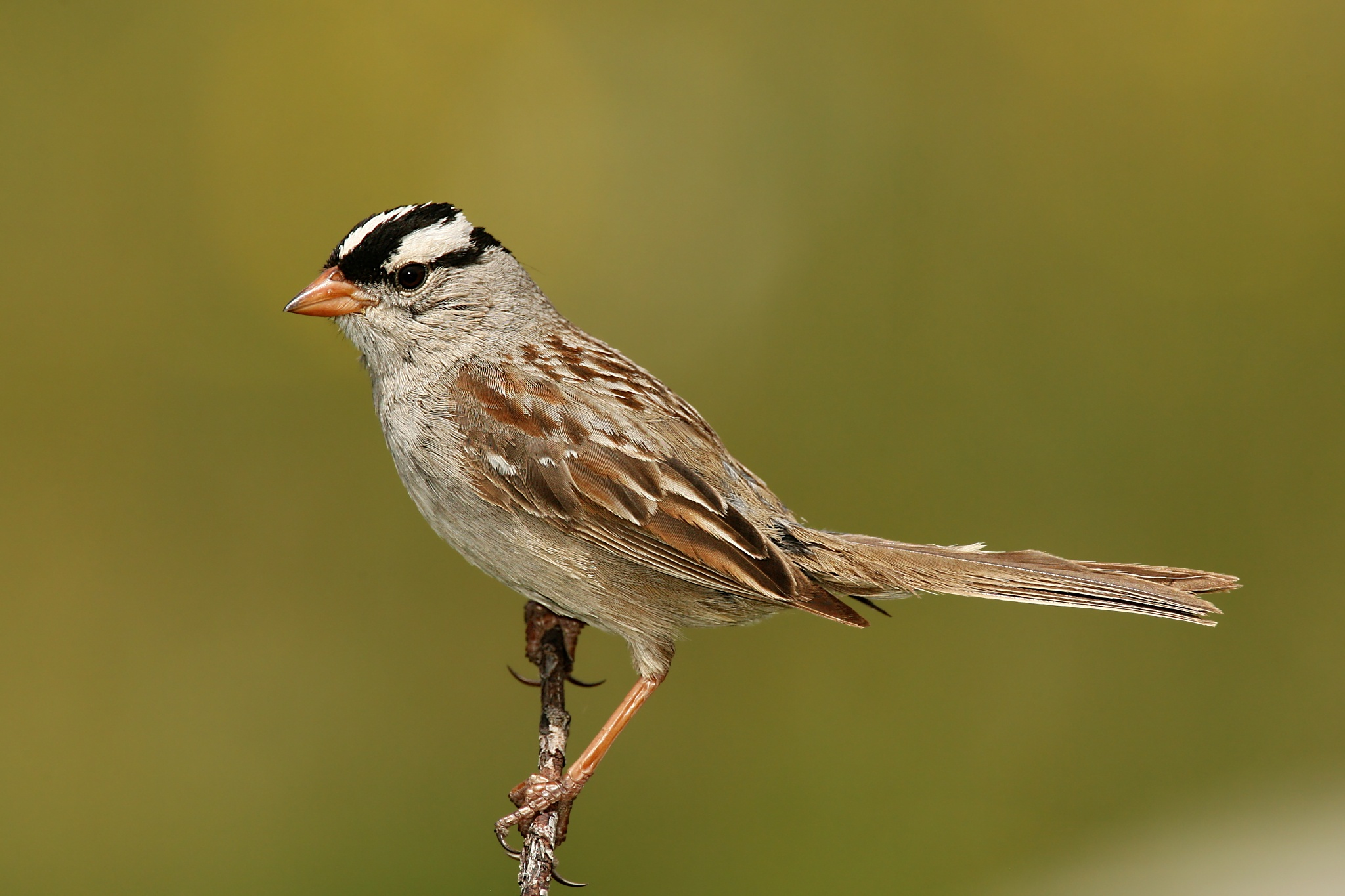
Male white-crowned sparrows approach intruders more closely when exposed to noise pollution

Noise pollution is widespread, which is mostly a result of transportation networks. Although there are many effects of noise pollution, two specific consequences are adjustments in population distribution and modified animal communication. Birds provide a clear example of both of these consequences. Altered population distributions can affect inter-species interactions. For example, the diversity of birds in the woodlands of New Mexico was significantly reduced in areas with unnatural noise levels. This change in diversity resulted in less nest predation, which was explained by the decreased presence of the dominant predator - the scrub-jay. This effect has also been observed in owls. A negative correlation was found between the noise intensity of an area and the probability that a long-eared owl will reside in that region. Suggested explanations for this outcome are that hunting efficiency was diminished and communication was less effective.

Noise pollution also affects conspecific communication. High noise levels may require animals to adjust their vocalizations in order for communication to remain effective. Bird songs are a well-studied component of animal communication. The use of adjusted songs was observed in Savannah sparrows residing in noisy environments. Adjusted songs were so distinct that their use in the control environment did not result in responses (i.e. aggressive territorial behaviour) typically observed when non-adjusted songs were vocalized. Failure to recognize conspecific vocalizations can also be detrimental to male-male competition. Male urban white-crowned sparrows approached stimulus songs of intruders more closely, regardless of song type, when in the presence of noise pollution. A higher frequency of harmful fights is a suggested consequence of this behaviour because of the relatively small distance between the intruding and defending males.

==== Marine animals ====
Noise pollution can also affect marine animals. There are many sources of noise in the world's oceans, such as the sounds produced by commercial shipping, sonars and acoustic deterrents. Unnatural noise levels can negatively affect reproductive behaviour, such as courtship behaviours. For example, painted goby males did not take part in visual courtship behaviour when in a noisy environment. Female painted gobies in this experiment were also less likely to spawn in a noisy environment. Noise pollution can also affect foraging behaviour in marine animals, which results in less effective strategies. Porpoises have been found to make fewer prey capture attempts, dive deeper, and cut their foraging behaviour short when a vessel passes by, which results in a higher energy expenditure. Shore crabs were also observed interrupting their foraging behaviour when in the presence of ship noise. Antipredator behaviour in marine animals has also been known to change when noise levels are high. Shore crabs took longer to return to their shelters when in the presence of ship noise. Neolamprologus pulcher (a cichlid fish) females defended their nest less against predators when boat noise was present.

==== Recommendations for marine animals ====
Specific mitigation strategies and recommendations have been presented by the Marine Mammal Commission (2007). They offer multiple ways to alleviate noise pollution in the ocean. Some strategies include removing the source of noise, employing sound attenuation devices, limiting the use of the sound source and monitoring operational requirements. They recommend improving research programs, creating consistent regulation standards that are better enforced and improving mitigation strategies.

=== Light pollution ===
Light pollution affects multiple aspects of animal behaviour, such as reproductive behaviour, foraging behaviour and antipredator behaviour. Altered reproductive behaviour has been observed in multiple taxa. Female crickets were less captious of males when they were raised in bright artificial light. Male crickets that were raised under continuous artificial light were discriminated against more than male crickets raised in darkness or moonlight. Female fireflies also altered their reproductive behaviour by failing to flash when placed under artificial light and males never flashed in response to these females. However, it is not only insects that are affected by light pollution. Male green frogs made less calls and moved more often when in the presence of artificial light. According to Baker and Richardson (2006), these behavioural changes negatively affect breeding success.

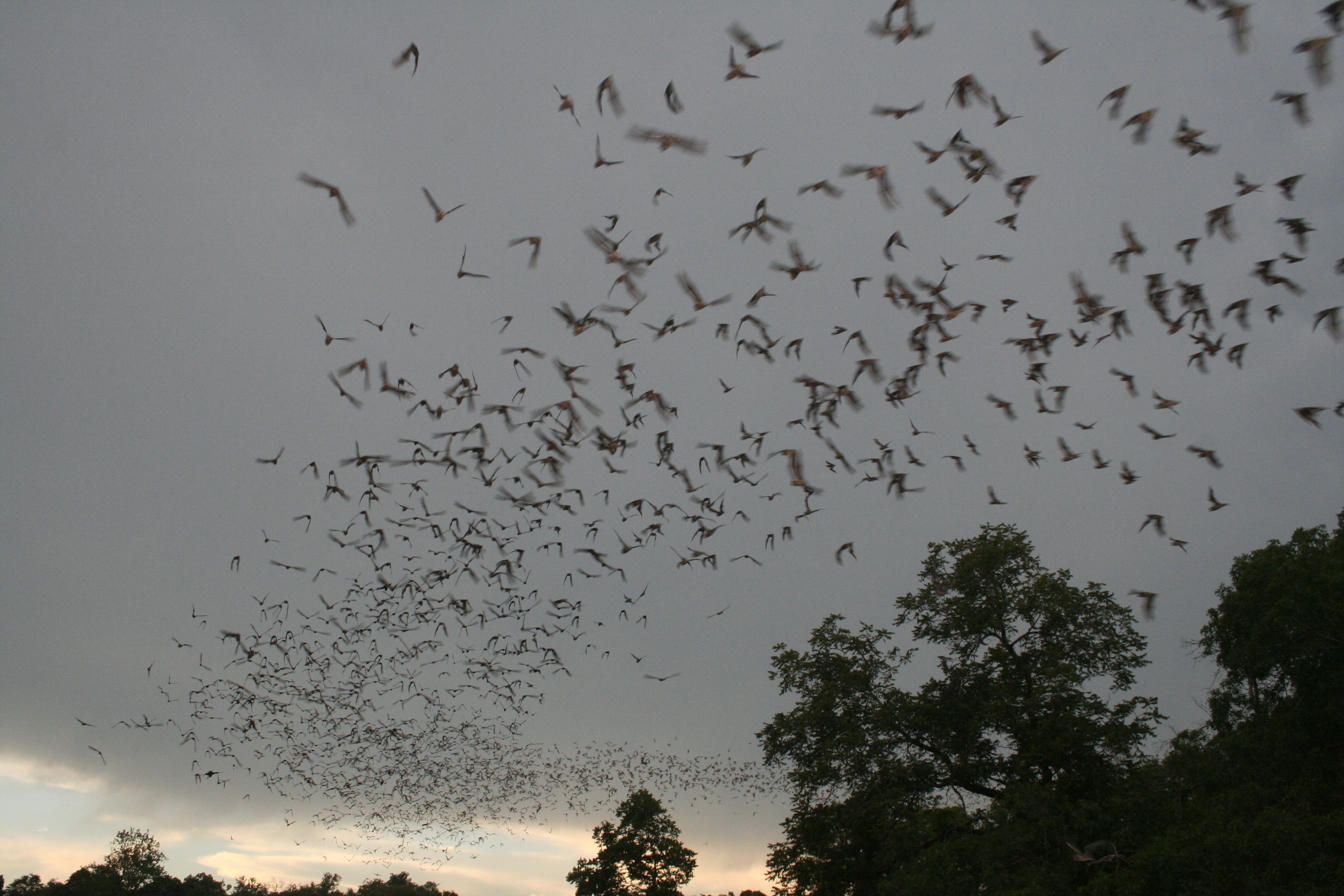
Bats miss optimal foraging time when exposed to light pollution.

Another consequence of light pollution is the disruption of foraging behaviour in wildlife, such as where and when they forage or hunt. Beach mice used foraging patches near sodium vapor lights or yellow bug lights less often than non-lit patches and they also harvested fewer seeds from these lit patches. This study also hypothesizes that artificial light may alter the movement of mice because of predation risks. Bats are another animal that are greatly affected by light pollution. The presence of artificial lights is associated with a delayed emergence of bats from their dwellings and less time spent emerged. This alteration in foraging behaviour causes bats to miss the most optimal hunting time for insects. According to this study, as little as one hour of artificial light exposure after dusk disrupts the bats foraging behaviour, as well as growth rates.

Light pollution can also alter antipredator behaviour in wildlife. When moths come within a close proximity of a hunting bat, they make a powerdive towards the ground (Roeder & Treat, 1961). If moths are in the presence of artificial light, they are less likely to make this powerdive manoeuver, which results in a reduced ability to evade bat predation. A suggested explanation for this behaviour, according to this study, is that moths turn their ultrasound detection off in daylight (or simulated daylight). Predator-prey interactions are also altered by noise pollution. An example of this is in loggerhead turtles and ghost crabs. Ghost crabs are attracted to artificial lights and begin to exhibit more aggressive predatory behaviour in the presence of the light. This study hypothesizes that loggerhead hatchling predation would also increase as a result of this modified predatory behaviour and the predator-prey relationship would, therefore, be altered.
