= Sunshine Project =

International NGO

The Sunshine Project was an international NGO dedicated to upholding prohibitions against biological warfare and, particularly, to preventing military abuse of biotechnology. It was directed by Edward Hammond.

With offices in Austin, Texas, and Hamburg, Germany, the Sunshine Project worked by exposing research on biological and chemical weapons. Typically, it accessed documents under the Freedom of Information Act and other open records laws, publishing reports and encouraging action to reduce the risk of biological warfare. It tracked the construction of high containment laboratory facilities and the dual-use activities of the U.S. biodefense program. Another focus was on documenting government-sponsored research and development of incapacitating "non-lethal" weapons, such as the chemical used by Russia to end the Moscow theater hostage crisis in 2002. The Sunshine Project was also active in meetings of the Biological Weapons Convention, the main international treaty prohibiting biological warfare.

An announcement was posted on The Sunshine Project website, "As of 1 February 2008, the Sunshine Project is suspending its operations", due to a lack of funding. Its website remained online for some time after this date and could be used as an archive of its activities and publications from 2000 through 2008. However, as of October 2013, the Sunshine Project website was offline. The domain for the website was then reappropriated by a Thai reforestation volunteer organization until September 2023. It now redirects to the internet pornography website 33porn.

== Biological weapons safety ==
The Sunshine Project Biosafety Bites (v.2) #14 6 June 2006
