= Antiandrogens in the environment =

Antiandrogens in the environment have become a topic of concern. Many industrial chemicals, including phthalates and pesticides, exhibit antiandrogen activity in animal experiments. Certain plant species have also been found to produce antiandrogens. In animal studies, environmental antiandrogens can harm reproductive organ development in fetuses exposed in utero as well as their offspring.

Exposure to antiandrogens can occur unintentionally due to natural or anthropogenic compounds in the environment. Environmental compounds affecting the endocrine system, termed endocrine disruptors, that antagonistically affect androgen receptors and androgen production can negatively affect animals that come in contact with the compounds as well as their future generations.

== Pesticides and insecticides ==
Exposure to pesticides with antiandrogen properties has been found to negatively affect laboratory animals. Androgens are important in fetal development as well as in pubertal development. Exposure during critical periods of development can cause reproductive malformations in males while exposure after birth and before puberty can delay puberty.

Animal studies with vinclozolin, procymidone, linuron, and the DDT metabolite dichlorodiphenyldichloroethylene (p.p’-DDE) have shown irregular reproductive development due to their function as androgen receptor antagonists that inhibit androgen-activated gene expression. Even with low doses of antiandrogenic pesticides, developmental effects such as reduced anogenital distance and induction of areolas were seen in male rats.

Animal studies show that deformities result in offspring exposed to antiandrogens. Male mice can display malformations that resemble the reproductive organs of females as in the case of exposure to vinclozolin or procymidone. Exposure to vinclozolin or procymidone in utero feminized male offspring, as seen in abnormalities of anogenital distance, small or absent sex accessory glands, hypospadias, undescended testes, retained nipples, cleft phallus, and presence of a vaginal pouch. Male mice exposed before puberty to vinclozolin experienced delayed pubertal development visualized by delayed onset of androgen-dependent preputial separation.

Ketoconazole is an imidazole derivative is used as a broad-spectrum antifungal agent effective against a variety of fungal infections. Although ketoconazole is a relatively weak antiandrogen, high doses side-effects lead to reduced levels of androgens from both the testicles and adrenal glands.

Phenothrin is an insecticide that also possesses antiandrogen activity and has been associated with a small epidemic of gynecomastia via isolated environmental exposure.

== Industrial chemicals ==
Industrial chemicals with antiandrogenic effects are ubiquitous in the environment. Consumer products such as toys and cosmetics may contain phthalates or parabens, which disrupt androgen synthesis.

Phthalates are mainly found as softeners in plastics, but also perfumes, nail varnish and other cosmetics. Fetuses that are exposed to a mixture of phthalates in utero may show signs of disrupted reproductive development. When di-n-butyl phthalate (DBP), diisobutyl phthalate (DiBP), benzyl butyl phthalate (BBP), Bis(2-ethylhexyl) phthalate (DEHP) and di-n-pentyl phthalate (DPP) were combined, reductions in both testosterone synthesis and gene expression of steroidogenic pathway proteins were seen. The results in male rats were undescended testes and abnormal development of reproductive tissues.

Parabens are used as preservatives and/or antimicrobial agents and commonly found in food, soap, detergent, toothpaste, disinfectant, cosmetic and pharmaceutical products. Paraben esters, such as butylparaben, have been found to mimic androgen antagonist activity. Antiandrogenic endocrine disruption has been shown in aquatic species, but the mechanism is unknown. Researchers believe parabens have the ability to bind to human androgen receptors but it still remains unclear.

Bisphenols such as bisphenol A are both antiandrogens and estrogens.

== Phytochemicals ==
Antiandrogens can also occur naturally in plants.

The best known plant-derived antiandrogen is 3,3'-diindolylmethane found in cruciferous vegetables, which are members of the cabbage family.

The compound N-butylbenzenesulfonamide (NBBS) isolated from the bark of Prunus africana, the Subsaharan red stinkwood tree, is a specific androgen antagonist and has been used as alternative medicine in benign prostatic hyperplasia.

Licorice, or Glycyrrhiza glabra native to southern Europe, India, and parts of Asia has shown antiandrogen activity in male rats.
