= Atrazine =

Herbicide

- Atrazine

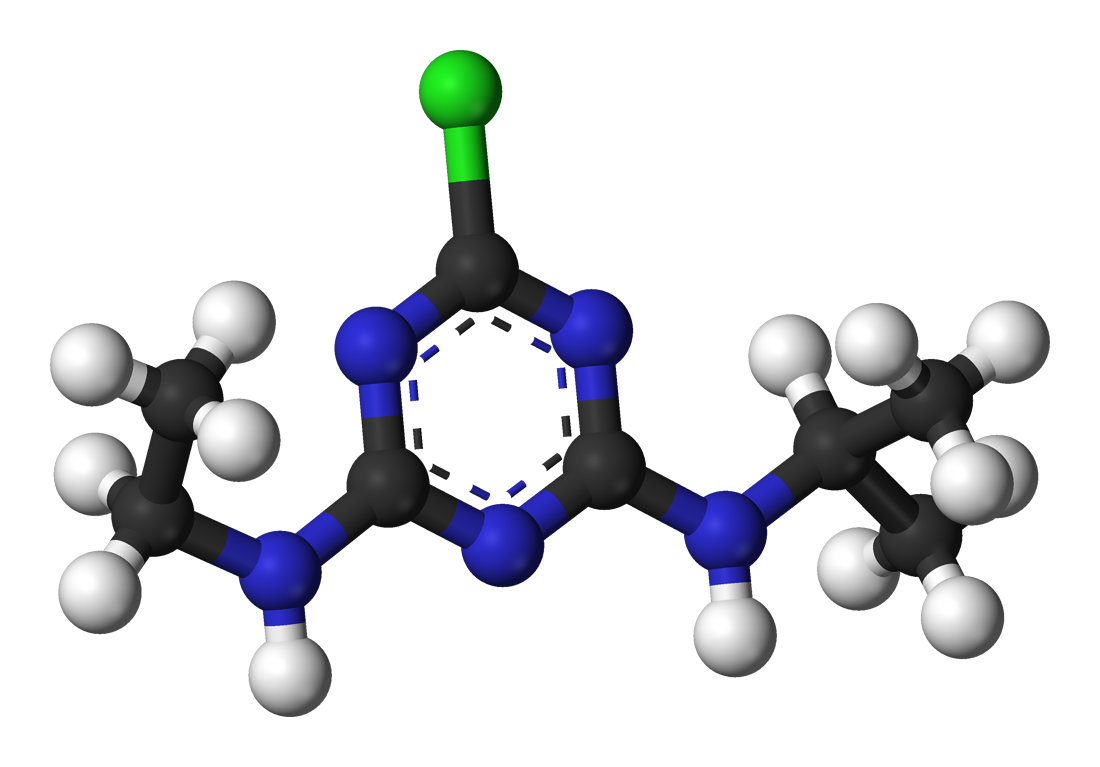
- Atrazine

Names
- Preferred IUPAC name 6-Chloro-N^{2}-ethyl-N^{4}-(propan-2-yl)-1,3,5-triazine-2,4-diamine
- Other names Atrazine; 1-Chloro-3-ethylamino-5-isopropylamino-2,4,6-triazine; 2-Chloro-4-ethylamino-6-isopropylamino-s-triazine; 6-Chloro-N-ethyl-N'-(1-methylethyl)-1,3,5-triazine-2,4-diamine

Identifiers
| CAS Number | 1912-24-9 |
| 3D model (JSmol) | Interactive image |
| ChEBI | CHEBI:15930 |
| ChEMBL | ChEMBL15063 |
| ChemSpider | 2169 |
| DrugBank | DB07392 |
| ECHA InfoCard | 100.016.017 |
| KEGG | C06551 |
| PubChem CID | 2256 |
| UNII | QJA9M5H4IM |
| CompTox Dashboard (EPA) | DTXSID9020112 |
- InChI: InChI=1S/C8H14ClN5/c1-4-10-7-12-6(9)13-8(14-7)11-5(2)3/h5H,4H2,1-3H3,(H2,10,11,12,13,14) Key: MXWJVTOOROXGIU-UHFFFAOYSA-N; InChI=1/C8H14ClN5/c1-4-10-7-12-6(9)13-8(14-7)11-5(2)3/h5H,4H2,1-3H3,(H2,10,11,12,13,14) Key: MXWJVTOOROXGIU-UHFFFAOYAJ
- SMILES: Clc1nc(nc(n1)NC(C)C)NCC

Properties
| Chemical formula | C_{8}H_{14}ClN_{5} |
| Molar mass | 215.69 g·mol^{−1} |
| Appearance | Colorless solid |
| Density | 1.187 g/cm^{3} |
| Melting point | 175 °C (347 °F; 448 K) |
| Boiling point | 200 °C (392 °F; 473 K) decomposes |
| Solubility in water | 7 mg/100 mL |

Hazards
| Flash point | Noncombustible |
- NIOSH (US health exposure limits)
| PEL (Permissible) | None |
| REL (Recommended) | TWA 5 mg/m^{3} |
| IDLH (Immediate danger) | N.D. |
- Except where otherwise noted, data are given for materials in their standard state (at 25 °C [77 °F], 100 kPa). verify (what is ?) Infobox references

Atrazine (/ˈætrəziːn/ A-trə-zeen) is a chlorinated herbicide of the triazine class. It is used to prevent pre-emergence broadleaf weeds in crops such as maize (corn), soybean and sugarcane, and also in turf landscaping, such as golf courses and residential lawns. Atrazine is one of the most widely used herbicides in the United States, Canada, Australia, and Brazil, but has been banned in other countries including in the European Union and the Gulf Cooperation Council.

In general, use of this herbicide is controversial and often highly regulated.

As of 2001, atrazine was the most common pesticide found in drinking water samples collected in the U.S.

== Uses ==
Atrazine is an herbicide that is used to stop pre- and post-emergence broadleaf and grassy weeds in crops such as sorghum, maize, sugarcane, lupins, pine, and eucalypt plantations, and triazine-tolerant canola. In the United States as of 2014, atrazine was the second-most widely used herbicide after glyphosate, with 76 million pounds (34 thousand metric tons) of it applied each year, nearly identical to its usage in 1974, of 76.8 million pounds.

Corn yields has been estimated to increase from 1% to 8%. In another study looking at combined data from 236 university corn field trials from 1986 to 2005, atrazine treatments showed an average increase of 5.7 US bushels per acre (0.50 m^{3}/ha) (~400 kilograms per hectare (360 lb/acre)) than alternative herbicide treatments. Effects on sorghum yields have been estimated to be as high as 20%, owing in part to the absence of alternative weed control products that can be used on sorghum.

== Chemistry and biochemistry ==
Atrazine was invented in 1958 in the Geigy laboratories as the second of a series of 1,3,5-triazines.

Atrazine is prepared from cyanuric chloride, which is treated sequentially with ethylamine and isopropylamine. Like other triazine herbicides, atrazine functions by binding to the plastoquinone-binding protein in photosystem II, which animals lack. Plant death results from starvation and oxidative damage caused by breakdown in the electron transport process. Oxidative damage is accelerated at high light intensity.

Atrazine has been found to act as an agonist of the G protein-coupled estrogen receptor 1. Atrazine has been shown to bind covalently to (chemically react with) a large number of mammalian proteins.

== Degradation ==
Atrazine chlorohydrolase pathway

Atrazine remains in soil for a matter of months (although in some soils can persist to at least four years) and can migrate from soil to groundwater; once in groundwater, it degrades slowly. The low rates of biodegradation are attributed to atrazine's low solubility. It has been detected in groundwater at high levels in some regions of the U.S. where it is used on some crops and turf. The U.S. Environmental Protection Agency expresses concern regarding contamination of surface waters (lakes, rivers, and streams). Atrazine rapidly degrades in the presence of reduced iron-bearing soil clays, such as ferruginous smectites.

Irradiation with 254 nm (ultraviolet light) degrades atrazine.

=== Biodegradation ===
Atrazine biodegradation occur by two pathways:

1. Hydrolysis of the C-Cl bond is followed by the ethyl and isopropyl groups, catalyzed by the hydrolase enzymes called AtzA, AtzB, and AtzC. The end product of this process is cyanuric acid, itself unstable with respect to ammonia and carbon dioxide. The best characterized organisms that use this pathway are of Pseudomonas sp. strain ADP.
2. Dealkylation of the amino groups gives 2-chloro-4-hydroxy-6-amino-1,3,5-triazine, the degradation of which is unknown. This path also occurs in Pseudomonas species, as well as a number of bacteria.

A common pathway for atrazine degradation involves the intermediate cyanuric acid, which can serve as a nitrogen source for aerobic microorganisms. Some aerobic atrazine degraders have been shown to use the compound for growth under anoxia in the presence of nitrate as an electron acceptor,

The genes for enzymes AtzA-C are highly conserved in atrazine-degrading organisms. The insertion elements flanking each gene suggest that they are involved in the assembly of this specialized catabolic pathway.

== Toxicology ==
According to Extension Toxicology Network in the U.S., "The oral median Lethal Dose or LD_{50} for atrazine is 3090 mg/kg in rats, 1750 mg/kg in mice, 750 mg/kg in rabbits, and 1000 mg/kg in hamsters. The dermal LD_{50} in rabbits is 7500 mg/kg. The 1-hour inhalation LC_{50} is greater than 0.7 mg/L in rats. The 4-hour inhalation LC_{50} is 5.2 mg/L in rats." The maximum contaminant level is 0.003 mg/L and the reference dose is 0.035 mg/kg/day.

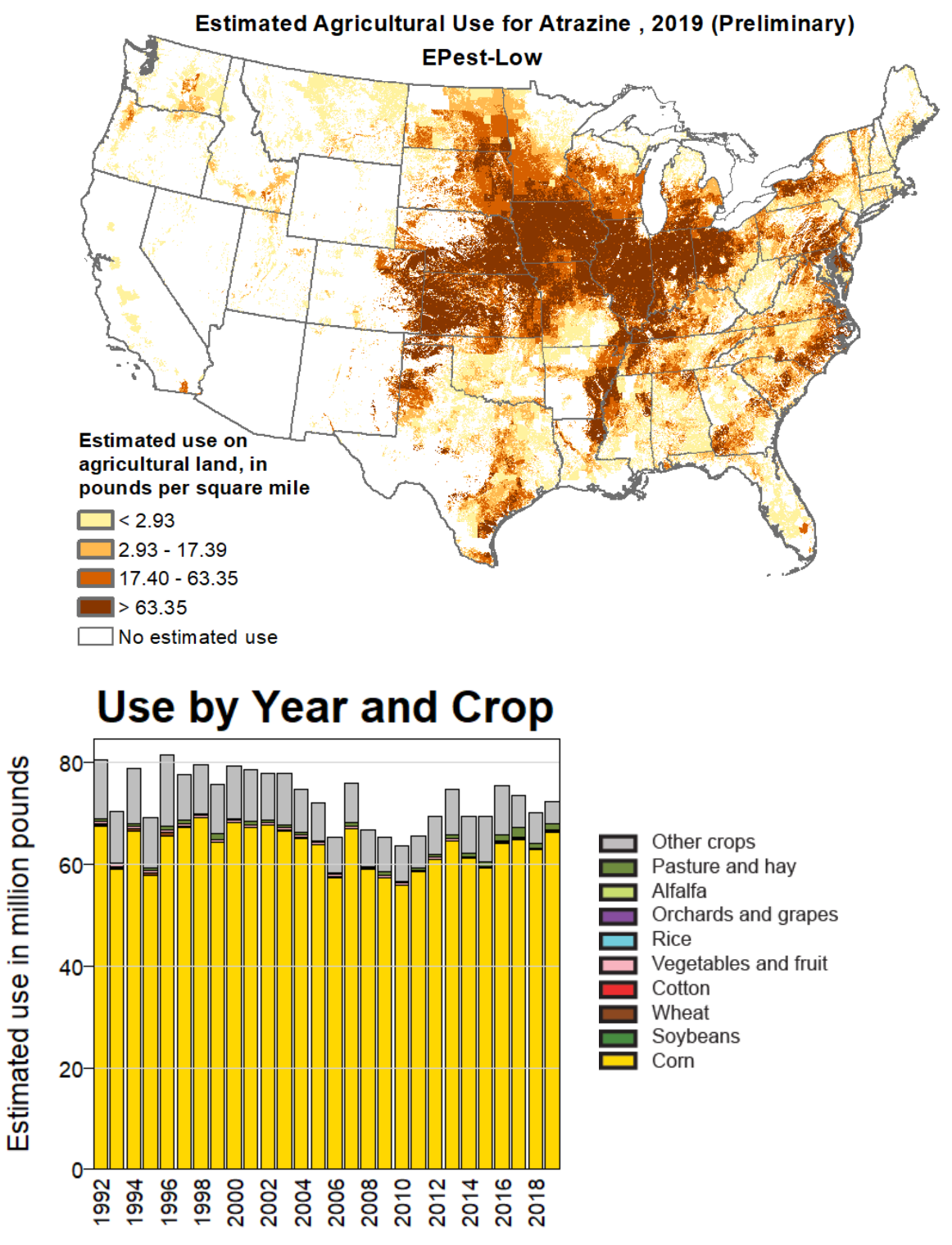
Atrazine use in the U.S. in 2019

=== Carcinogenicity ===
In 2025, IARC updated the classification of atrazine to be "probably carcinogenic to humans" (Group 2A). A 2011 study that tracked 57,310 licensed American pesticide applicators over 13 years concluded that "there was no consistent evidence of an association between atrazine use and any cancer site".

=== General reproductive health ===
Studies suggest it is an endocrine disruptor, an agent that can alter the natural hormonal system.

Some studies have been complicated by poor reproducibility conflicts of interest, and accusations of retribution.

The U.S. EPA's Scientific Advisory Panel examined relevant studies and concluded in 2010, "atrazine does not adversely affect amphibian gonadal development based on a review of laboratory and field studies". It recommended proper study design for further investigation. As required by the EPA, two experiments were conducted under Good Laboratory Practices (GLP) and were inspected by EPA and German regulatory authorities, concluding 2009 that "long-term exposure of larval X. laevis to atrazine at concentrations ranging from 0.01 to 100 μg/L does not affect growth, larval development, or sexual differentiation".

Atrazine may affect reproduction of minnows.

A 2011 review of the mammalian reproductive toxicology of atrazine jointly conducted by the World Health Organization and the Food and Agriculture Organization of the United Nations concluded that atrazine was not teratogenic. Reproductive effects in rats and rabbits were only seen at doses that were toxic to the mother. Observed adverse effects in rats included fetal resorption in rates (at doses ≥50 mg/kg per day), delays in sexual development in female rats (at doses ≥30 mg/kg per day), and decreased birth weight (at doses ≥3.6 mg/kg per day).

A 2014 systematic review, funded by atrazine manufacturer Syngenta, assessed its relation to reproductive health problems. The authors concluded that the quality of most studies was poor and without good quality data, the results were difficult to assess, though it was noted that no single category of negative pregnancy outcome was found consistently across studies. The authors concluded that a causal link between atrazine and adverse pregnancy outcomes was not warranted due to the poor quality of the data and the lack of robust findings across studies. Syngenta was not involved in the design, collection, management, analysis, or interpretation of the data and did not participate in the preparation of the manuscript.

=== Aquatic impacts and regulation ===
According to the U.S. EPA, the maximum allowable atrazine concentration in drinking water is 3 μg/L. This level was established in 2011 and remains in place in 2025.

Because it is pervasive in run-off, its impact on aquatic life has been scrutinized. A Natural Resources Defense Council report from 2009 said that the EPA is ignoring atrazine contamination in surface and drinking water in the central United States. Atrazine has a negative impact on aquatic life.

In 2010, the Australian Pesticides and Veterinary Medicines Authority (APVMA) tentatively concluded that environmental atrazine "at existing levels of exposure" was not affecting amphibian populations in Australia consistent with the 2007 U.S. EPA findings. APVMA responded to Hayes' 2010 published paper, that his findings "do not provide sufficient evidence to justify a reconsideration of current regulations which are based on a very extensive dataset".

== Regulatory action ==
Its use was banned in the European Union in 2004.

In Canada, the PMRA allowed the product's registration to remain unchanged in 2015. For context, the EU's ban was based on a maximum acceptable pollutant level of 0.1 μg/L. The U.S. drinking water standard is 3 μg/L; the Canadian standard is 5 μg/L.

== Legal actions ==
In 2012, Syngenta, an atrazine manufacturer, was the defendant in a class-action lawsuit concerning the levels of atrazine in human water supplies. Syngenta agreed to pay $105 million to reimburse more than one thousand water systems for "the cost of filtering atrazine from drinking water". The company denied all wrongdoing.

== See also ==
- Pesticides in the United States – Atrazine
- Endocrine disruptor
- Simazine
