= Polymer concrete =

Type of concrete that uses polymers to replace lime-type cements as a binder

Polymer concrete is a type of concrete that uses a polymer to replace lime-type cements as a binder. One specific type is epoxy granite, where the polymer used is exclusively epoxy. In some cases the polymer is used in addition to Portland cement to form Polymer Cement Concrete (PCC) or Polymer Modified Concrete (PMC). Polymers in concrete have been overseen by Committee 548 of the American Concrete Institute since 1971.

The term "polymer-based concrete" (PBC) serves as an umbrella term for subtypes, which are distinguished by their binder, composition and performance.

== Composition ==
In polymer concrete, thermoplastic polymers are often used to form a film at the interface between the cement matrix and the aggregate, subsequently improving bonding and lowering permeability, however more typically thermosetting resins are used as the principal polymer component due to their high thermal stability and resistance to a wide variety of chemicals. Polymer concrete is also composed of aggregates that include silica, quartz, granite, limestone, or other material. The aggregate should be of good quality, free of dust and other debris, and dry. Failure to fulfill these criteria can reduce the bond strength between the polymer binder and the aggregate.

== Uses ==
Polymer concrete may be used for new construction or repairing of old concrete. The adhesive properties of polymer concrete allow repair of both polymer and conventional cement-based concretes. The corrosion resistance and low permeability of polymer concrete allows it to be used in swimming pools, sewer structure applications, drainage channels, electrolytic cells for base metal recovery, and other structures that contain liquids or corrosive chemicals. It is especially suited to the construction and rehabilitation of manholes due to their ability to withstand toxic and corrosive sewer gases and bacteria commonly found in sewer systems. Unlike traditional concrete structures, polymer concrete requires no coating or welding of PVC-protected seams. It can also be used as a bonded wearing course for asphalt pavement, for higher durability and higher strength upon a concrete substrate, and in skate parks, as it is a very smooth surface.

Polymer concrete has historically not been widely adopted due to the high costs and difficulty associated with traditional manufacturing techniques.

Polymer concrete in the form of epoxy granite is becoming more widely used in the construction of machine tool bases (such as mills and metal lathes) in place of cast iron due to its superior mechanical properties and a high chemical resistance.

=== Mechanical properties and behavior ===
High compressibility, tensile strength and flexibility, along with greater durability characterize polymer concrete.Compared with Portland cement concrete, the most common concrete type utilized in construction, polymer concrete better bonds to steel materials and other concrete materials. In polymer concrete, the polymer binders that are central to the composition exhibit a low elastic modulus making it far more flexible than traditional cement concrete that contain mineral binders exhibiting high elastic modulus. The rapid polymerization of polymer-based concrete enables greater ability to repair structural issues.

=== Thermal and chemical properties ===
The thermal expansion coefficient of polymer concrete is approximately twice that of traditional cement concrete. However, the combination of a low elastic modulus and a high thermal expansion coefficient induces interfacial shear stresses. In high temperature environments, the elastic modulus of these polymer matrices are greatly reduced so this must be considered in structural applications. In low temperature environments, there is good long-term durability with respect to freeze and thaw cycles.

The low permeability of water in polymer concrete is attributed to the hydrophobicity of the polymers that compose the concrete. As a result, polymer concrete is far more suitable for chemically aggressive environments compared to traditional cement concrete.

== Specifications ==
Following are some specification examples of the features of polymer concrete:

Material	Density kg/m^{3}	Compressive strength
Urea formaldehyde polymer concrete	2260	37 MPa (5,400 psi)
Polyester concrete	N/A	95 MPa (13,800 psi)
Epoxy concrete	N/A	58 MPa (8,400 psi)
Polymer Modified Concrete	N/A	31 MPa (4,500 psi)

== Sustainability ==
Contrary to traditional cement concrete, polymer concrete is posited as a sustainable alternative as it incorporates recycled aggregates, industrial by-products, and waste within its composition. The incorporation of these materials extends the life of the concrete through greater resistance to environmental degradation. The binding agents in polymer concrete are more expensive than the mineral binders in cement concrete.
