= Epoxy =

Type of material

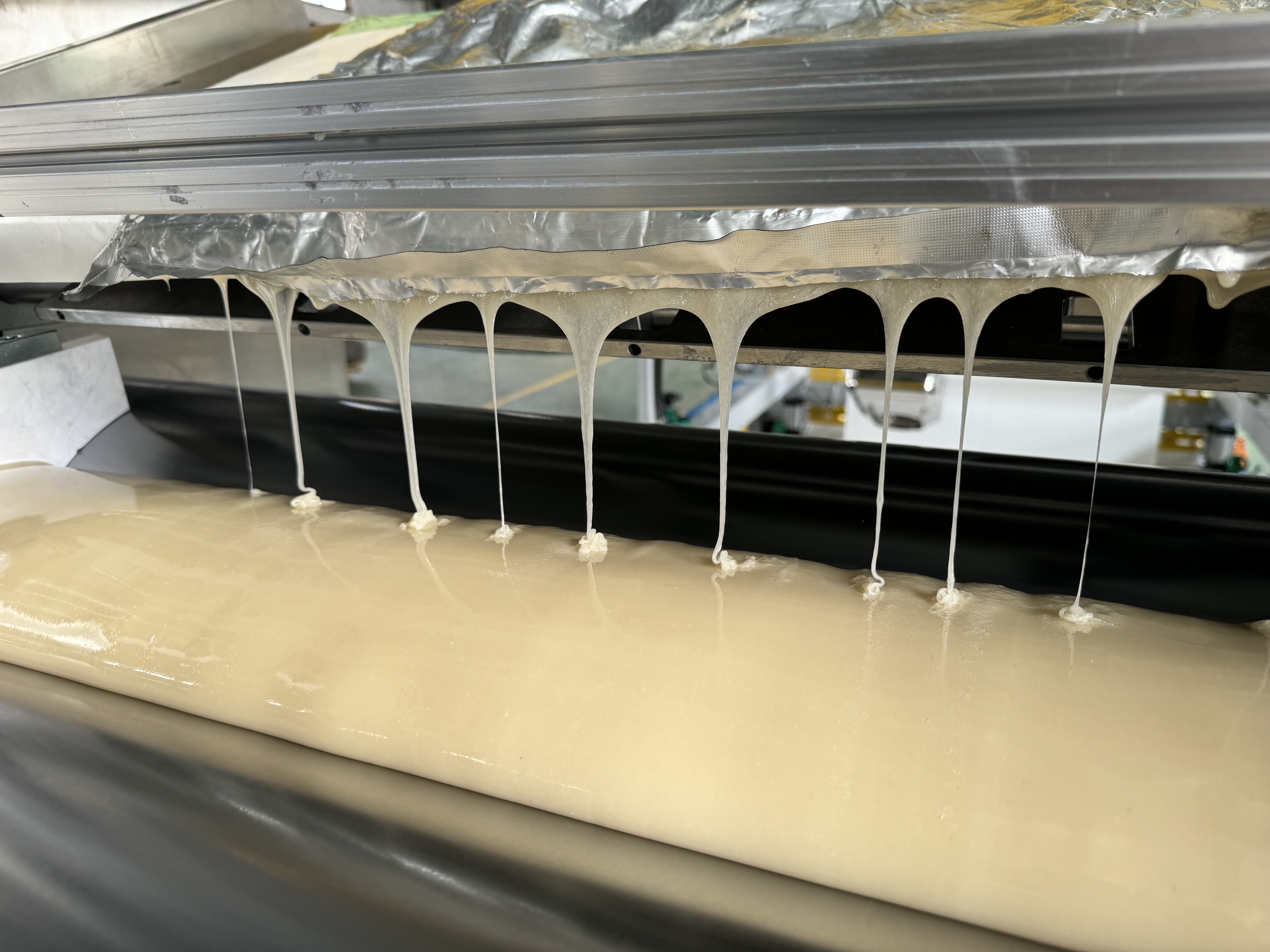
Aerospace-grade epoxy resin used in prepreg manufacturing

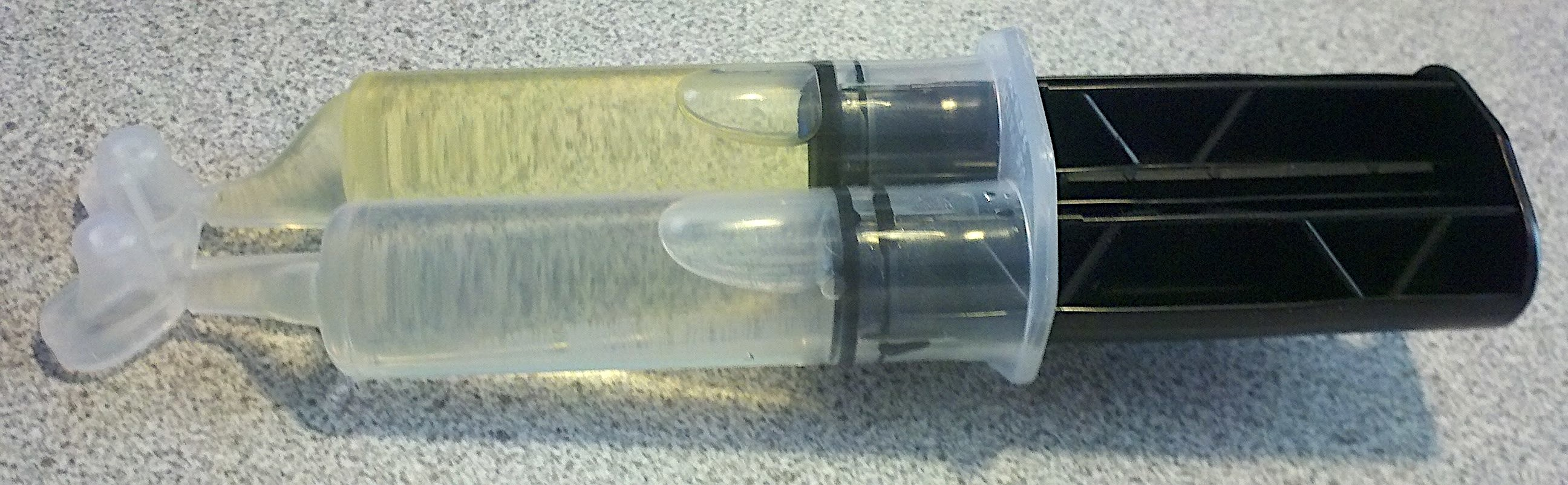
A syringe of "5-minute" epoxy glue, containing separate compartments for the epoxy resin and the hardener

Structure of the epoxide group, a reactive functional group present in all epoxy resins

Epoxy is the family of basic components or cured end products of epoxy resins, also known as polyepoxides, a class of reactive prepolymers and polymers which contain epoxide groups. The epoxide functional group is also collectively called epoxy. The IUPAC name for an epoxide group is an oxirane. Epoxy is primarily made from petroleum (crude oil) and natural gas feedstocks, though plant based alternatives are increasingly used.

Epoxy resins may be reacted (cross-linked) either with themselves through catalytic homopolymerisation, or with a wide range of co-reactants including polyfunctional amines, acids (and acid anhydrides), phenols, alcohols and thiols (sometimes called mercaptans). These co-reactants are often referred to as hardeners or curatives, and the cross-linking reaction is commonly referred to as curing.

Reaction of polyepoxides with themselves or with polyfunctional hardeners forms a thermosetting polymer, often with favorable mechanical properties and high thermal and chemical resistance. Epoxy has a wide range of applications, including metal coatings, composites, use in electronics, electrical components (e.g. for chips on board), LEDs, high-tension electrical insulators, paintbrush manufacturing, fiber-reinforced plastic materials, and adhesives for structural and other purposes.

The health risks associated with exposure to epoxy resin compounds include contact dermatitis and allergic reactions, as well as respiratory problems from breathing vapor and sanding dust, especially from compounds not fully cured.

== History ==
Condensation of epoxides and amines was first reported and patented by Paul Schlack of Germany in 1934. Claims of discovery of bisphenol-A-based epoxy resins include Pierre Castan in 1943. Castan's work was licensed by Ciba, Ltd. of Switzerland, which went on to become one of the three major epoxy resin producers worldwide. In 1946, Sylvan Greenlee, working for the Devoe & Raynolds Company (now part of Hexion Inc.), patented resin derived from bisphenol-A and epichlorohydrin.

== Chemistry ==
=== Manufacture ===
Coupling reaction of a hydroxy group with epichlorohydrin, followed by dehydrohalogenation

Most of the commercially used epoxy monomers are produced by the reaction of a compound with acidic hydroxy groups and epichlorohydrin. First a hydroxy group reacts in a coupling reaction with epichlorohydrin, followed by dehydrohalogenation. Epoxy resins produced from such epoxy monomers are called glycidyl-based epoxy resins. The hydroxy group may be derived from aliphatic diols, polyols (polyether polyols), phenolic compounds or dicarboxylic acids. Phenols can be compounds such as bisphenol A and novolak. Polyols can be compounds such as 1,4-butanediol. Di- and polyols lead to glycidyl ethers. Dicarboxylic acids such as hexahydrophthalic acid are used for diglycide ester resins. Instead of a hydroxy group, the nitrogen atom of an amine or amide can be reacted with epichlorohydrin.

Synthesis of an epoxide by use of a peracid

The other production route for epoxy resins is the conversion of aliphatic or cycloaliphatic alkenes with peracids: In contrast to glycidyl-based epoxy resins, this production of such epoxy monomers does not require an acidic hydrogen atom but an aliphatic double bond.

=== Bisphenol-based ===
Synthesis of bisphenol A diglycidyl ether

The most common epoxy resins are based on reacting epichlorohydrin (ECH) with bisphenol A, resulting in a different chemical substance known as bisphenol A diglycidyl ether (commonly known as BADGE or DGEBA). Bisphenol A-based resins are the most widely commercialised resins but also other bisphenols are analogously reacted with epichlorohydrin, for example Bisphenol F.

In this two-stage reaction, epichlorohydrin is first added to bisphenol A (bis(3-chloro-2-hydroxy-propoxy)bisphenol A is formed), then a bisepoxide is formed in a condensation reaction with a stoichiometric amount of sodium hydroxide. The chlorine atom is released as sodium chloride (NaCl) and the hydrogen atom as water.

Higher molecular weight diglycidyl ethers (n ≥ 1) are formed by the reaction of the bisphenol A diglycidyl ether formed with further bisphenol A; this is called prepolymerization.

Synthesis of bisphenol-A-diglycidyl ether with a high molar mass

A product comprising a few repeat units (n = 1 to 2) is a viscous, clear liquid; this is called a liquid epoxy resin. A product comprising more repeating units (n = 2 to 30) is at room temperature a colorless solid, which is correspondingly referred to as solid epoxy resin.

Instead of bisphenol A, other bisphenols (especially bisphenol F) or brominated bisphenols (e. g. tetrabromobisphenol A) can be used for the said epoxidation and prepolymerisation. Bisphenol F may undergo epoxy resin formation in a similar fashion to bisphenol A. These resins typically have lower viscosity and a higher mean epoxy content per gram than bisphenol A resins, which (once cured) gives them increased chemical resistance.

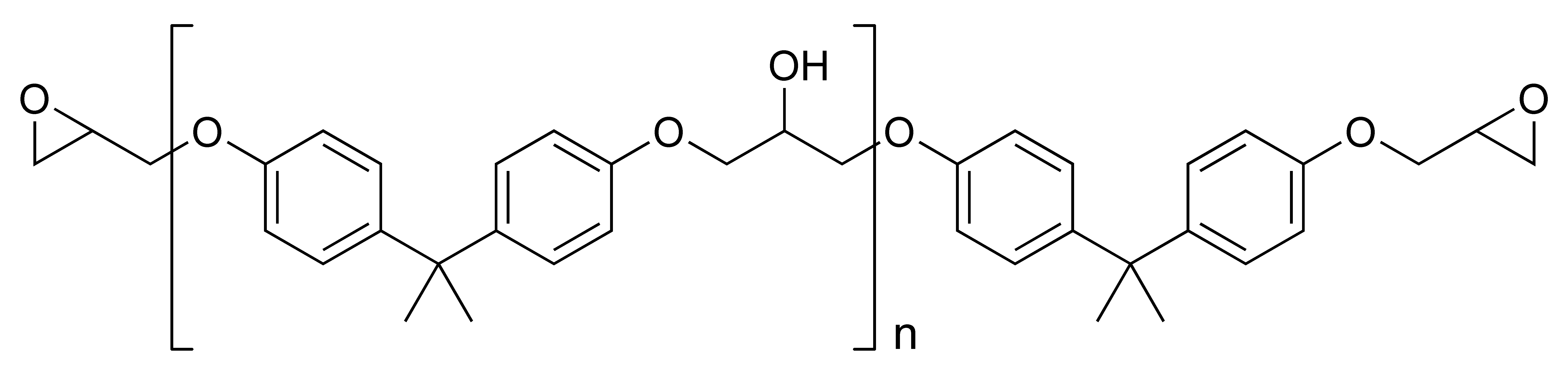
Structure of bisphenol-A diglycidyl ether epoxy resin: n denotes the number of polymerized subunits and is typically in the range from 0 to 25.

Increasing the ratio of bisphenol A to epichlorohydrin during manufacture produces higher molecular weight linear polyethers with glycidyl end groups, which are semi-solid to hard crystalline materials at room temperature depending on the molecular weight achieved. This route of synthesis is known as the "taffy" process. The usual route to higher molecular weight epoxy resins is to start with liquid epoxy resin (LER) and add a calculated amount of bisphenol A and then a catalyst is added and the reaction heated to circa 160 °C (320 °F). This process is known as "advancement". As the molecular weight of the resin increases, the epoxide content reduces and the material behaves more and more like a thermoplastic. Very high molecular weight polycondensates (ca. 30,000–70,000 g/mol) form a class known as phenoxy resins and contain virtually no epoxide groups (since the terminal epoxy groups are insignificant compared to the total size of the molecule). These resins do however contain hydroxyl groups throughout the backbone, which may also undergo other cross-linking reactions, e.g. with aminoplasts, phenoplasts and isocyanates.

Epoxy resins are polymeric or semi-polymeric materials or an oligomer, and as such rarely exist as pure substances, since variable chain length results from the polymerisation reaction used to produce them. High purity grades can be produced for certain applications, e.g. using a distillation purification process. One downside of high purity liquid grades is their tendency to form crystalline solids due to their highly regular structure, which then require melting to enable processing.

An important criterion for epoxy resins is the Epoxy value which is connected to the epoxide group content. This is expressed as the "epoxide equivalent weight", which is the ratio between the molecular weight of the monomer and the number of epoxide groups. This parameter is used to calculate the mass of co-reactant (hardener) to use when curing epoxy resins. Epoxies are typically cured with stoichiometric or near-stoichiometric quantities of hardener to achieve the best physical properties.

=== Novolaks ===
General structure of epoxyphenol novolak with n usually in the range from 0 to 4. The compound is present in the form of various constitutional isomers.

Novolaks are produced by reacting phenol with methanal (formaldehyde). The reaction of epichlorohydrin and novolaks produces novolaks with glycidyl residues, such as epoxyphenol novolak (EPN) or epoxycresol novolak (ECN). These highly viscous to solid resins typically carry 2 to 6 epoxy groups per molecule. By curing, highly cross-linked polymers with high temperature and chemical resistance but low mechanical flexibility are formed due to the high functionality, and hence high crosslink density of these resins.

=== Aliphatic ===
Structural formula of 3,4-epoxycyclohexylmethyl-3',4'-epoxycyclohexane carboxylate

There are two common types of aliphatic epoxy resins: those obtained by epoxidation of double bonds (cycloaliphatic epoxides and epoxidized vegetable oils) and those formed by reaction with epichlorohydrin (glycidyl ethers and esters).

Cycloaliphatic epoxides contain one or more aliphatic rings in the molecule on which the oxirane ring is contained (e.g. 3,4-epoxycyclohexylmethyl-3',4'-epoxycyclohexane carboxylate). They are produced by the reaction of a cyclic alkene with a peracid (see above). Cycloaliphatic epoxides are characterised by their aliphatic structure, high oxirane content and the absence of chlorine, which results in low viscosity and (once cured) good weather resistance, low dielectric constants and high T_{g}. However, aliphatic epoxy resins polymerize very slowly at room temperature, so higher temperatures and suitable accelerators are usually required. Because aliphatic epoxies have a lower electron density than aromatics, cycloaliphatic epoxies react less readily with nucleophiles than bisphenol A-based epoxy resins (which have aromatic ether groups). This means that conventional nucleophilic hardeners such as amines are hardly suitable for crosslinking. Cycloaliphatic epoxides are therefore usually homopolymerized thermally or UV-initiated in an electrophilic or cationic reaction. Due to the low dielectric constants and the absence of chlorine, cycloaliphatic epoxides are often used to encapsulate electronic systems, such as microchips or LEDs. They are also used for radiation-cured paints and varnishes. Due to their high price, however, their use has so far been limited to such applications.

Epoxidized vegetable oils are formed by epoxidation of unsaturated fatty acids by reaction with peracids. In this case, the peracids can also be formed in situ by reacting carboxylic acids with hydrogen peroxide. Compared with LERs (liquid epoxy resins) they have very low viscosities. If, however, they are used in larger proportions as reactive diluents, this often leads to reduced chemical and thermal resistance and to poorer mechanical properties of the cured epoxides. Large scale epoxidized vegetable oils such as epoxidized soy and lens oils are used to a large extent as secondary plasticizers and cost stabilizers for PVC.

Aliphatic glycidyl epoxy resins of low molar mass (mono-, bi- or polyfunctional) are formed by the reaction of epichlorohydrin with aliphatic alcohols or polyols (glycidyl ethers are formed) or with aliphatic carboxylic acids (glycidyl esters are formed). The reaction is carried out in the presence of a base such as sodium hydroxide, analogous to the formation of bisphenol A-diglycidyl ether. Also aliphatic glycidyl epoxy resins usually have a low viscosity compared to aromatic epoxy resins. They are therefore added to other epoxy resins as reactive diluents or as adhesion promoters. Epoxy resins made of (long-chain) polyols are also added to improve tensile strength and impact strength.

A related class is cycloaliphatic epoxy resin, which contains one or more cycloaliphatic rings in the molecule (e.g. 3,4-epoxycyclohexylmethyl-3,4-epoxycyclohexane carboxylate). This class also displays lower viscosity at room temperature, but offers significantly higher temperature resistance than the aliphatic epoxy diluents. However, reactivity is rather low compared to other classes of epoxy resin, and high temperature curing using suitable accelerators is normally required. As aromaticity is not present in these materials as it is in Bisphenol A and F resins, the UV stability is considerably improved.

=== Halogenated ===
Halogenated epoxy resins are admixed for special properties, in particular brominated and fluorinated epoxy resins are used.

Brominated bisphenol A is used when flame retardant properties are required, such as in some electrical applications (e.g. printed circuit boards). The tetrabrominated bisphenol A (TBBPA, 2,2-bis(3,5-dibromophenyl)propane) or its diglycidyl ether, 2,2-bis[3,5-dibromo-4-(2,3-epoxypropoxy)phenyl]propane, can be added to the epoxy formulation. The formulation may then be reacted in the same way as pure bisphenol A. Some (non-crosslinked) epoxy resins with very high molar mass are added to engineering thermoplastics, again to achieve flame retardant properties.

Fluorinated epoxy resins have been investigated for some high performance applications, such as the fluorinated diglycidether 5-heptafluoropropyl-1,3-bis[2-(2,3-epoxypropoxy)hexafluoro-2-propyl]benzene. As it has a low surface tension, it is added as a wetting agent (surfactant) for contact with glass fibres. Its reactivity to hardeners is comparable to that of bisphenol A. When cured, the epoxy resin leads to a thermosetting plastic with high chemical resistance and low water absorption. However, the commercial use of fluorinated epoxy resins is limited by their high cost and low T_{g}.

=== Diluents ===
Epoxy resins diluents are typically formed by glycidylation of aliphatic alcohols or polyols and also aromatic alcohols. The resulting materials may be monofunctional (e.g. dodecanol glycidyl ether), difunctional (1,4-Butanediol diglycidyl ether), or higher functionality (e.g. trimethylolpropane triglycidyl ether). These resins typically display low viscosity at room temperature (10–200 mPa.s) and are often referred to as reactive diluents. They are rarely used alone, but are rather employed to modify (reduce) the viscosity of other epoxy resins. This has led to the term modified epoxy resin to denote those containing viscosity-lowering reactive diluents. The use of the diluent does effect mechanical properties and microstructure of epoxy resins. Mechanical properties of epoxy resins are generally not improved by use of diluents. Biobased epoxy diluents are also available.

=== Glycidylamine ===
Glycidylamine epoxy resins are higher functionality epoxies which are formed when aromatic amines are reacted with epichlorohydrin. Important industrial grades are triglycidyl-p-aminophenol (functionality 3) and N,N,N′,N′-tetraglycidyl-bis-(4-aminophenyl)-methane (functionality 4). The resins are low to medium viscosity at room temperature, which makes them easier to process than EPN or ECN resins. This coupled with high reactivity, plus high temperature resistance and mechanical properties of the resulting cured network makes them important materials for aerospace composite applications.

== Curing ==
Structure of a cured epoxy glue. The triamine hardener is shown in red, the resin in black. The resin's epoxide groups have reacted with the hardener and are not present anymore. The material is highly crosslinked and contains many OH groups, which confer adhesive properties.

There are several dozen chemicals that can be used to cure epoxy, including amines, imidazoles, anhydrides and photosensitive chemicals. The study of epoxy curing is usually carried out by using differential scanning calorimetry.

In general, uncured epoxy resins have only poor mechanical, chemical and heat resistance properties. However, good properties are obtained by reacting the linear epoxy resin with suitable curatives to form three-dimensional cross-linked thermoset structures. This process is commonly referred to as curing or gelation process. Curing of epoxy resins is an exothermic reaction and in some cases produces sufficient heat to cause thermal degradation if not controlled. Curing does induce residual stress in epoxy systems which have been studied. The induced stresses may be alleviated with flexibilisers.

Curing may be achieved by reacting an epoxy with itself (homopolymerisation) or by forming a copolymer with polyfunctional curatives or hardeners. This curing is what produces the qualities of the substance such as resistance, durability, versatility, and adhesion. In principle, any molecule containing a reactive hydrogen may react with the epoxide groups of the epoxy resin. Common classes of hardeners for epoxy resins include amines, acids, acid anhydrides, phenols, alcohols and thiols. Relative reactivity (lowest first) is approximately in the order: phenol < anhydride < aromatic amine < cycloaliphatic amine < aliphatic amine < thiol.

While some epoxy resin/ hardener combinations will cure at ambient temperature, many require heat, with temperatures up to 150 °C (302 °F) being common, and up to 200 °C (392 °F) for some specialist systems. Insufficient heat during cure will result in a network with incomplete polymerisation, and thus reduced mechanical, chemical and heat resistance. Cure temperature should typically attain the glass transition temperature (T_{g}) of the fully cured network in order to achieve maximum properties. Temperature is sometimes increased in a step-wise fashion to control the rate of curing and prevent excessive heat build-up from the exothermic reaction.

Hardeners which show only low or limited reactivity at ambient temperature, but which react with epoxy resins at elevated temperature are referred to as latent hardeners. When using latent hardeners, the epoxy resin and hardener may be mixed and stored for some time prior to use, which is advantageous for many industrial processes. Very latent hardeners enable one-component (1K) products to be produced, whereby the resin and hardener are supplied pre-mixed to the end user and only require heat to initiate curing. One-component products generally have shorter shelf-lives than standard 2-component systems, and products may require cooled storage and transport.

The epoxy curing reaction may be accelerated by addition of small quantities of accelerators. Tertiary amines, carboxylic acids and alcohols (especially phenols) are effective accelerators. Bisphenol A is a highly effective and widely used accelerator, but is now increasingly replaced due to health concerns with this substance. The most widely used accelerator is 2,4,6-Tris(dimethylaminomethyl)phenol.

=== Homopolymerisation ===
Epoxy resin may be reacted with itself in the presence of an anionic catalyst (a Lewis base such as tertiary amines or imidazoles) or a cationic catalyst (a Lewis acid such as a boron trifluoride complex) to form a cured network. This process is known as catalytic homopolymerisation. The resulting network contains only ether bridges, and exhibits high thermal and chemical resistance, but is brittle and often requires elevated temperature for the curing process, so finds only niche applications industrially. Epoxy homopolymerisation is often used when there is a requirement for UV curing, since cationic UV catalysts may be employed (e.g. for UV coatings).

=== Amines ===
Polyfunctional primary amines form an important class of epoxy hardeners. Primary amines undergo an addition reaction with the epoxide group to form a hydroxyl group and a secondary amine. The secondary amine can further react with an epoxide to form a tertiary amine and an additional hydroxyl group. Kinetic studies have shown the reactivity of the primary amine to be approximately double that of the secondary amine. Use of a difunctional or polyfunctional amine forms a three-dimensional cross-linked network. Aliphatic, cycloaliphatic and aromatic amines are all employed as epoxy hardeners. Amine type hardeners will alter both the processing properties (viscosity, reactivity) and the final properties (mechanical, temperature and heat resistance) of the cured copolymer network. Thus amine structure is normally selected according to the application. Overall reactivity potential for different hardeners can roughly be ordered; aliphatic amines > cycloaliphatic amines > aromatic amines, though aliphatic amines with steric hindrance near the amino groups may react as slowly as some of the aromatic amines. Slower reactivity allows longer working times for processors. Temperature resistance generally increases in the same order, since aromatic amines form much more rigid structures than aliphatic amines. Aromatic amines were widely used as epoxy resin hardeners, due to the excellent end properties when mixed with a parent resin. Over the past few decades concern about the possible adverse health effects of many aromatic amines has led to increased use of aliphatic or cycloaliphatic amine alternatives. Amines are also blended, adducted and reacted to alter properties and these amine resins are more often used to cure epoxy resins than a pure amine such as TETA. Increasingly, water-based polyamines are also used to help reduce the toxicity profile among other reasons.

Structure of TETA, a typical hardener. The amine (NH_{2}) groups react with the epoxide groups of the resin during polymerisation.

=== Anhydrides ===
Epoxy resins may be thermally cured with anhydrides to create polymers with significant property retention at elevated temperatures for extended periods of time. Reaction and subsequent crosslinking occur only after opening of the anhydride ring, e.g. by secondary hydroxyl groups in the epoxy resin. Homopolymerization may also occur between epoxide and hydroxyl groups. The high latency of anhydride hardeners makes them suitable for processing systems which require addition of mineral fillers prior to curing, e.g. for high voltage electrical insulators. Cure speed may be improved by matching anhydrides with suitable accelerators. For dianhydrides, and to a lesser extent, monoanhydrides, non-stoichiometric, empirical determinations are often used to optimize dosing levels. In some cases, blends of dianhydrides and monoanhydrides can improve metering and mixing with liquid epoxy resins.

=== Phenols ===
Polyphenols, such as bisphenol A or novolacs can react with epoxy resins at elevated temperatures (130–180 °C, 266–356 °F), normally in the presence of a catalyst. The resulting material has ether linkages and displays higher chemical and oxidation resistance than typically obtained by curing with amines or anhydrides. Since many novolacs are solids, this class of hardeners is often employed for powder coatings.

=== Thiols ===
Also known as mercaptans, thiols contain a sulfur which reacts very readily with the epoxide group, even at ambient or sub-ambient temperatures. While the resulting network does not typically display high temperature or chemical resistance, the high reactivity of the thiol group makes it useful for applications where heated curing is not possible, or very fast cure is required e.g. for domestic DIY adhesives and chemical rock bolt anchors. Thiols have a characteristic odor, which can be detected in many two-component household adhesives.

=== Isocyanates ===
The reaction of epoxide groups and isocyanate groups can result in two predominant types of ring structures: isocyanurate rings (through trimerization of isocyanate groups) and oxazolidinone rings (through the reaction of an isocyanate group with an epoxide group). The reaction is carried with the presence of a catalyst at temperatures ranging from 150 °C and 180 °C. studies have shown that there is a correlation between epoxy equivalent weight (EEW) and the glass transition temperature (Tg) of the final polymer, indicating that higher EEW corresponds to higher Tg.

== Applications ==
The applications for epoxy-based materials are extensive and they are considered very versatile. The applications include coatings, adhesives and composite materials such as those using carbon fiber and fiberglass reinforcements (although polyester, vinyl ester, and other thermosetting resins are also used for glass-reinforced plastic). The chemistry of epoxies and the range of commercially available variations allows cure polymers to be produced with a very broad range of properties. They have been extensively used with concrete and cementitious systems. In general, epoxies are known for their excellent adhesion, chemical and heat resistance, good-to-excellent mechanical properties and very good electrical insulating properties. Many properties of epoxies can be modified (for example silver-filled epoxies with good electrical conductivity are available, although epoxies are typically electrically insulating). Variations offering high thermal insulation, or thermal conductivity combined with high electrical resistance for electronics applications, are available.

As with other classes of thermoset polymer materials, blending different grades of epoxy resin, as well as use of additives, plasticizers or fillers is common to achieve the desired processing or final properties, or to reduce cost. Use of blending, additives and fillers is often referred to as formulating.

All quantities of mix generate their own heat because the reaction is exothermic. Large quantities will generate more heat and thus greatly increase the rate of the reaction and so reduce working time (pot-life). So it is good practice to mix smaller amounts which can be used quickly to avoid waste and to be safer. There are various methods of toughening them, as they can be brittle. Rubber toughening is a key technology used for toughening.

=== Paints and coatings ===
Two part epoxy coatings were developed for heavy duty service on metal substrates and use less energy than heat-cured powder coatings. These systems provide a tough, protective coating with excellent hardness. One part epoxy coatings are formulated as an emulsion in water, and can be cleaned up without solvents.

Epoxy coatings are often used in industrial and automotive applications by various companies since they are more heat resistant than latex-based and alkyd-based paints. Epoxy paints tend to deteriorate, known as "chalking out", due to UV exposure. Epoxy coatings have also been used in drinking water applications. Epoxy coatings find much use to protect mild and other steels due to their excellent protective properties.

Change in color, known as yellowing, is a common phenomenon for epoxy materials and is often of concern in art and conservation applications. Epoxy resins yellow with time, even when not exposed to UV radiation. Significant advances in understanding yellowing of epoxies were achieved by Down first in 1984 (natural dark aging) and later in 1986 (high-intensity light aging). Down investigated various room-temperature-cure epoxy resin adhesives suitable for use in glass conservation, testing their tendency to yellow. A fundamental molecular understanding of epoxy yellowing was achieved, when Krauklis and Echtermeyer discovered the mechanistic origin of yellowing in a commonly used amine epoxy resin, published in 2018. They found that the molecular reason for epoxy yellowing was a thermo-oxidative evolution of carbonyl groups in the polymeric carbon–carbon backbone via a nucleophilic radical attack.

Polyester epoxies are used as powder coatings for washers, driers and other "white goods". Fusion Bonded Epoxy Powder Coatings (FBE) are extensively used for corrosion protection of steel pipes and fittings used in the oil and gas industry, potable water transmission pipelines (steel), and concrete reinforcing rebar. Epoxy coatings are also widely used as primers to improve the adhesion of automotive and marine paints especially on metal surfaces where corrosion (rusting) resistance is important. Metal cans and containers are often coated with epoxy to prevent rusting, especially for foods like tomatoes that are acidic. Epoxy resins are also used for decorative flooring applications such as terrazzo flooring, chip flooring, and colored aggregate flooring.

Epoxies have been modified in a variety of ways, including reacting with fatty acids derived from oils to yield epoxy esters, which were cured the same way as alkyds. Typical ones were L8 (80% linseed) and D4 (40% dehydrated castor oil). These were often reacted with styrene to make styrenated epoxy esters, used as primers. Curing with phenolics to make drum linings, curing esters with amine resins and pre-curing epoxies with amino resins to make resistant top coats. Organic chains maybe used to hydrophobically modify epoxy resins and change their properties. The effect of chain length of the modifiers has been studied.

=== Adhesives ===
Special epoxy is strong enough to withstand the forces between a surfboard fin and the fin mount. This epoxy is waterproof and capable of curing underwater. The blue-colored epoxy on the left is still undergoing curing.

Epoxy adhesives are a major part of the class of adhesives called "structural adhesives" or "engineering adhesives" (that includes polyurethane, acrylic, cyanoacrylate, and other chemistries.) These high-performance adhesives are used in the construction of aircraft, automobiles, bicycles, boats, golf clubs, skis, snowboards, and other applications where high strength bonds are required. Epoxy adhesives can be developed to suit almost any application. They can be used as adhesives for wood, metal, glass, stone, and some plastics. They can be made flexible or rigid, transparent or opaque/colored, fast setting or slow setting. Epoxy adhesives are better in heat and chemical resistance than other common adhesives. In general, epoxy adhesives cured with heat will be more heat- and chemical-resistant than those cured at room temperature. The strength of epoxy adhesives is degraded at temperatures above 350 °F (177 °C).

Some epoxies are cured by exposure to ultraviolet light. Such epoxies are commonly used in optics, fiber optics, and optoelectronics.

=== Industrial tooling and composites ===
Epoxy systems are used in industrial tooling applications to produce molds, master models, laminates, castings, fixtures, and other industrial production aids. This "plastic tooling" replaces metal, wood and other traditional materials, and generally improves the efficiency and either lowers the overall cost or shortens the lead-time for many industrial processes. Epoxies are also used in producing fiber-reinforced or composite parts. They are more expensive than polyester resins and vinyl ester resins, but usually produce stronger and more temperature-resistant thermoset polymer matrix composite parts. Machine bedding to overcome vibrations is a use in the form of epoxy granite.

=== Wind turbine technology composites ===
Epoxy resins are used as bonding matrix along with glass or carbon fiber fabrics to produce composites with very high strength to weight characteristics, allowing longer and more efficient rotor blades to be produced. In addition, for offshore and onshore wind energy installations, epoxy resins are used as protective coatings on steel towers, base struts and concrete foundations. Aliphatic polyurethane top coats are applied on top to ensure full UV protection, prolong operational lifetimes and lowering maintenance costs. Electric generators, connected via the drivetrain with the rotor blades, convert mechanical wind energy to usable electric energy, and rely on epoxies electrical insulation and high thermal resistance properties. The same applies to transformers, bushings, spacers, and composites cables connecting the windmills to the grid. In Europe, wind energy components account for the largest segment of epoxy applications, about 27% of the market.

=== Electrical systems and electronics ===
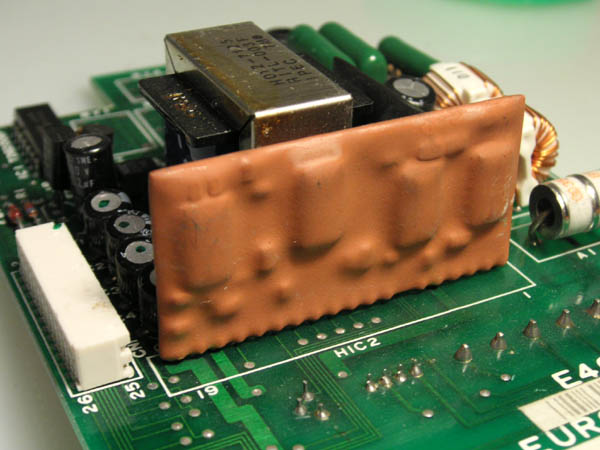
An epoxy-encapsulated hybrid circuit on a printed circuit board

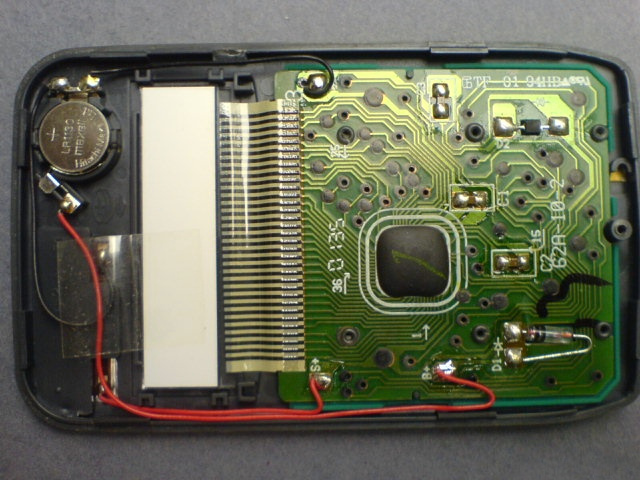
The dark blob of epoxy in the center covers the processor chip of a pocket calculator.

Epoxy resin formulations are important in the electronics industry, and are employed in motors, generators, transformers, switchgear, bushings, insulators, printed wiring boards (PWB), and semiconductor encapsulants. Epoxy resins are excellent electrical insulators and protect electrical components from short circuiting, dust and moisture. In the electronics industry epoxy resins are the primary resin used in overmolding integrated circuits, transistors and hybrid circuits, and making printed circuit boards. The most common type of circuit board, FR-4, is a sandwich of layers of fiberglass cloth bonded into a composite with an epoxy resin. Epoxy resins are used to bond copper foil to circuit board substrates, and are a component of the solder mask on many circuit boards.

Flexible epoxy resins are used for potting transformers and inductors. By using vacuum impregnation on uncured epoxy, winding-to-winding, winding-to-core, and winding-to-insulator air voids are eliminated. The cured epoxy is an electrical insulator and a much better conductor of heat than air. Transformer and inductor hot spots are greatly reduced, giving the component a stable and longer life than unpotted product.

Epoxy resins are applied using the technology of resin dispensing.

=== Petroleum & petrochemical ===
Epoxies can be used to plug selective layers in a reservoir which are producing excessive brine. The technique is named "water shut-off treatment".

=== Consumer and marine applications ===
Epoxies are sold in hardware stores, typically as a pack containing separate resin and hardener, which must be mixed immediately before use. They are also sold in boat shops as repair resins for marine applications. Epoxies typically are not used in the outer layer of a boat because they deteriorate by exposure to UV light. They are often used during boat repair and assembly, and then over-coated with conventional or two-part polyurethane paint or marine-varnishes that provide UV protection.

There are two main areas of marine use. Because of the better mechanical properties relative to the more common polyester resins, epoxies are used for commercial manufacture of components where a high strength/weight ratio is required. The second area is that their strength, gap filling properties and excellent adhesion to many materials including timber have created a boom in amateur building projects including aircraft and boats.

Normal gelcoat formulated for use with polyester resins and vinylester resins does not adhere to epoxy surfaces, though epoxy adheres very well if applied to polyester resin surfaces. "Flocoat" that is normally used to coat the interior of polyester fibreglass yachts is also compatible with epoxies.

Epoxy materials tend to harden somewhat more gradually, while polyester materials tend to harden quickly, particularly if a lot of catalyst is used. The chemical reactions in both cases are exothermic. If a large volume of epoxy is mixed at once, the concentrated heat generated by this exothermic reaction can cause the resin to prematurely harden, melt its mixing container, or even catch fire.

While it is common to associate polyester resins and epoxy resins, their properties are sufficiently different that they are properly treated as distinct materials. Polyester resins are typically low strength unless used with a reinforcing material like glass fibre, are relatively brittle unless reinforced, and have low adhesion. Epoxies, by contrast, are inherently strong, somewhat flexible and have excellent adhesion. However, polyester resins are much cheaper.

Epoxy resins typically require a precise mix of two components which form a third chemical to get the stated properties. Depending on the properties required, the ratio may be anything from 1:1 or over 10:1, but in usually they must be mixed exactly. The final product is then a precise thermoset plastic. Until they are mixed the two elements are relatively inert, although the 'hardeners' tend to be more chemically active and should be protected from the atmosphere and moisture. The rate of the reaction can be changed by using different hardeners, which may change the nature of the final product, or by controlling the temperature.

By contrast, polyester resins are usually made available in a 'promoted' form, such that the progress of previously-mixed resins from liquid to solid is already underway, albeit very slowly. The only variable available to the user is to change the rate of this process using a catalyst, often Methyl-Ethyl-Ketone-Peroxide (MEKP), which is very toxic. The presence of the catalyst in the final product actually detracts from the desirable properties, so that small amounts of catalyst are preferable, so long as the hardening proceeds at an acceptable pace. The rate of cure of polyesters can therefore be controlled by the amount and type of catalyst as well as by the temperature.

As adhesives, epoxies bond in three ways: a) Mechanically, because the bonding surfaces are roughened; b) by proximity, because the cured resins are physically so close to the bonding surfaces that they are hard to separate; c) ionically, because the epoxy resins form ionic bonds at an atomic level with the bonding surfaces. This last is substantially the strongest of the three. By contrast, polyester resins can only bond using the first two of these, which greatly reduces their utility as adhesives and in marine repair.

=== Construction applications ===
Epoxies have been researched and used for construction for a few decades. Although they increase cost of mortars and concrete when used as an additive, they enhance properties. Research is ongoing to investigate the use of epoxies and other recycled plastics in mortars to enhance properties and recycle waste. Densifying plastic materials such as PET and plastic bags and then using them to partially replace aggregate and depolymerizing PET to use as a polymeric binder in addition to epoxy to enhance concrete are actively being studied.

=== Aerospace applications ===
In the aerospace industry, epoxy is used as a structural matrix material which is then reinforced by fiber. Typical fiber reinforcements include glass, carbon, Kevlar, and boron. Epoxies are also used as a structural glue. Materials like wood, and others that are 'low-tech' are glued with epoxy resin. Epoxies generally out-perform most other resin types in terms of mechanical properties and resistance to environmental degradation.

=== Biology ===
Water-soluble epoxies such as Durcupan are commonly used for embedding electron microscope samples in plastic so they may be sectioned (sliced thin) with a microtome and then imaged.

=== Art ===
Epoxy resin, mixed with pigment, may be used as a painting medium, by pouring layers on top of each other to form a complete picture. It is also used in jewelry, as a doming resin for decorations and labels, and in decoupage type applications for art, countertops, and tables. Its seamless and glossy finish, along with its ability to be molded into various shapes, makes epoxy resin a favored choice for creating minimalist and statement pieces in modern furniture design and into various other design styles, including industrial, rustic, and even eclectic. It has been used and studied for art and historic structure preservation.

== Production ==
The global epoxy resin market was valued at approximately $8 billion in 2016. The epoxy resin market is dominated by the Asia-Pacific region, which contributes 55.2% of the total market share. China is the major producer and consumer globally, consuming almost 35% of the global resin production. The global market is made up of approximately 50–100 manufacturers of basic or commodity epoxy resins and hardeners. In Europe, about 323,000 tonnes of epoxy resin were manufactured in 2017 generating some €1,055 million in sales. Germany is the largest market for epoxy resins in Europe, followed by Italy, France, the UK, Spain, the Netherlands and Austria.

These commodity epoxy manufacturers mentioned above typically do not sell epoxy resins in a form usable to smaller end users, so there is another group of companies that purchases epoxy raw materials from the major producers and then compounds (blends, modifies, or otherwise customizes) epoxy systems from these raw materials. These companies are known as "formulators". The majority of the epoxy systems sold are produced by these formulators and they comprise over 60% of the dollar value of the epoxy market. There are hundreds of ways that these formulators can modify epoxies—by adding mineral fillers (talc, silica, alumina, etc.), by adding flexibilizers, viscosity reducers, colorants, thickeners, accelerators, adhesion promoters, etc. These modifications are made to reduce costs, to improve performance, and to improve processing convenience. As a result, a typical formulator sells dozens or even thousands of formulations—each tailored to the requirements of a particular application or market.

The raw materials for epoxy resin production are today largely petroleum derived, although some plant derived sources are now becoming commercially available (e.g. plant derived glycerol used to make epichlorohydrin).

== Renewable, recycled, waterborne and biobased epoxy ==
As there is a general trend to renewable and "green" sources and greater use of biobased materials, research is ongoing in the epoxy arena too. Waterborne epoxy paints have been around since the 1970s and research is ongoing. There is also movement to use waste as well as recycled raw materials where possible. Waste granite filings are produced in the mining industry. Research is being done on innovative solutions such as using waste granite powders in epoxy resins and designing binders for coatings based on this. Other work is ongoing to produce epoxy and epoxy based coatings from recycled raw materials including PET bottles. Monomers for epoxy resins can be derived from several different biomass sources.

== Health risks ==
Liquid epoxy resins in their uncured state are mostly classed as irritant to the eyes and skin, as well as toxic to aquatic organisms. Solid epoxy resins are generally safer than liquid epoxy resins, and many are classified non-hazardous materials. One particular risk associated with epoxy resins is sensitization. The risk has been shown to be more pronounced in epoxy resins containing low molecular weight epoxy diluents. Allergic contact dermatitis from epoxy resin systems may be caused not only by the resin itself but also by hardeners and reactive diluents, and volatile hardeners and reactive diluents can cause an airborne form of the dermatitis. Exposure to epoxy resins can, over time, induce an allergic reaction. Sensitization generally occurs due to repeated exposure (e.g. through poor working hygiene or lack of protective equipment) over a long period of time. Allergic reaction sometimes occurs at a time which is delayed several days from the exposure. Allergic reaction is often visible in the form of dermatitis, particularly in areas where the exposure has been highest (commonly hands and forearms), although lesions may also appear on the neck and face. Rubber gloves give poor protection against epoxy chemicals, and gloves made of laminated multilayer plastic or thick reusable nitrile are recommended instead. In a laboratory study of epoxy-based anti-corrosion coatings, disposable nitrile gloves were not permeated by either of the two coating formulations tested, and the authors recommended nitrile gloves to minimize skin exposure to bisphenol A diglycidyl ether. Epoxy use is a main source of occupational asthma among users of plastics. Safe disposal also needs considering but usually involves deliberate curing to produce solid rather than liquid waste.

== See also ==
- Pollution
