= Rock (geology) =

Naturally occurring mineral aggregate

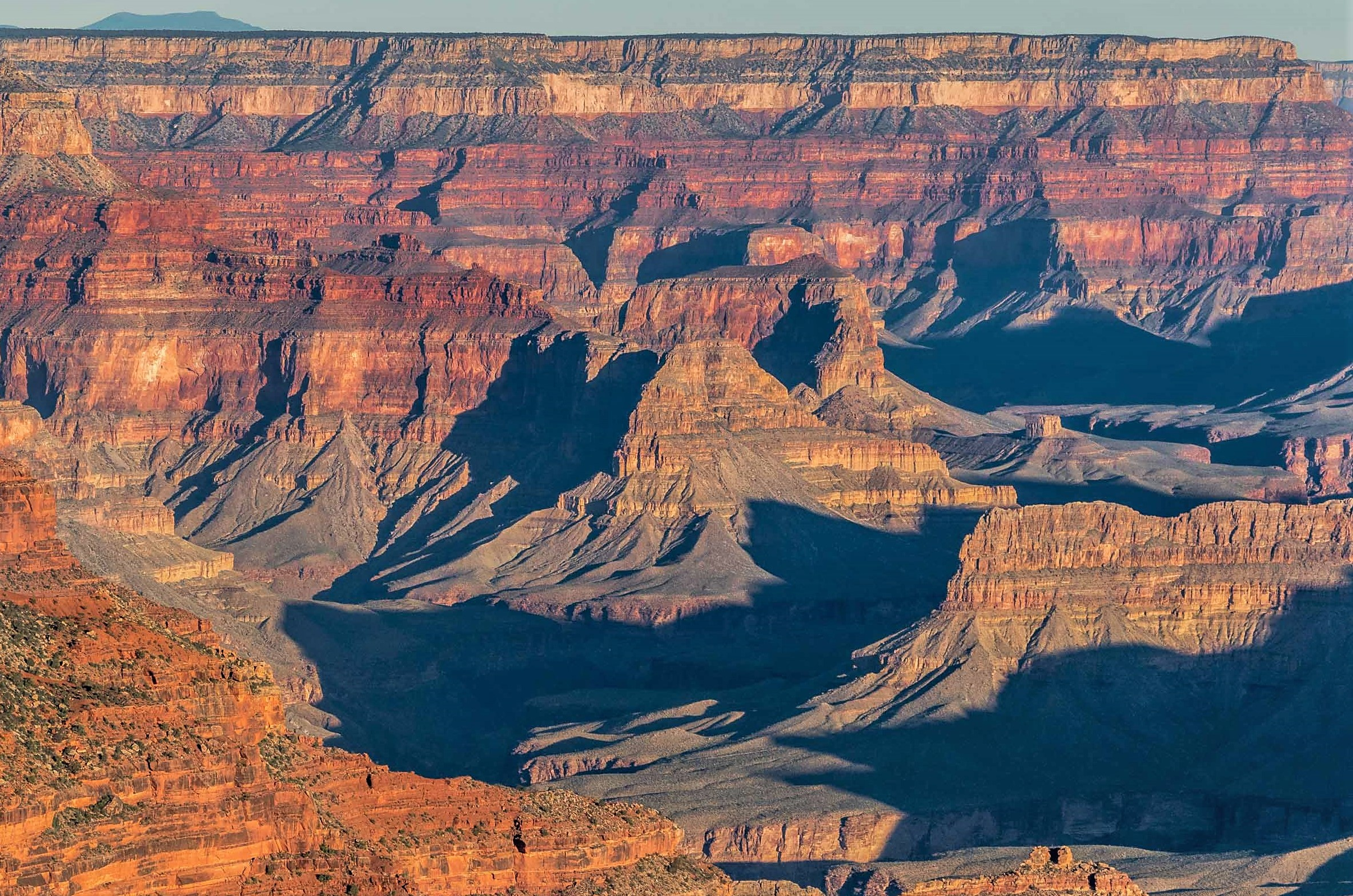
The Grand Canyon, an incision through layers of sedimentary rocks.

In geology, a rock (also called a stone) is any naturally occurring solid mass or aggregate of minerals or mineraloid matter. It is categorized by the minerals included, its chemical composition, and the way in which it is formed. Rocks form the Earth's outer solid layer, the crust, and most of its interior, except for the liquid outer core and pockets of magma in the asthenosphere. The study of rocks involves multiple subdisciplines of geology, including petrology and mineralogy. It may be limited to rocks found on Earth, or it may include planetary geology that studies the rocks of other celestial objects.

Rocks are usually grouped into three main groups: igneous rocks, sedimentary rocks, and metamorphic rocks. Igneous rocks are formed when magma cools in the Earth's crust, or lava cools on the ground surface or the seabed. Sedimentary rocks are formed by diagenesis and lithification of sediments, which in turn are formed by the weathering, transport, and deposition of existing rocks. Metamorphic rocks are formed when existing rocks are subjected to such high pressures and temperatures that they are transformed without significant melting.

Humanity has made use of rocks since the time the earliest humans lived. This early period, called the Stone Age, saw the development of many stone tools. Stone was then used as a major component in the construction of buildings and early infrastructure. Mining developed to extract rocks from the Earth and obtain the minerals within them, including metals. Modern technology has allowed the development of new human-made rocks and rock-like substances, such as concrete.

== Study ==
Geology is the study of Earth and its components, including the study of rock formations. Petrology is the study of the character and origin of rocks. Mineralogy is the study of the mineral components that create rocks. The study of rocks and their components has contributed to the geological understanding of Earth's history, the archaeological understanding of human history, and the development of engineering and technology in human society.

While the history of geology includes many theories of rocks and their origins that have persisted throughout human history, the study of rocks was developed as a formal science during the 19th century. Plutonism was developed as a theory during this time, and the discovery of radioactive decay in 1896 allowed for the radiometric dating of rocks. Understanding of plate tectonics developed in the second half of the 20th century.

== Classification ==
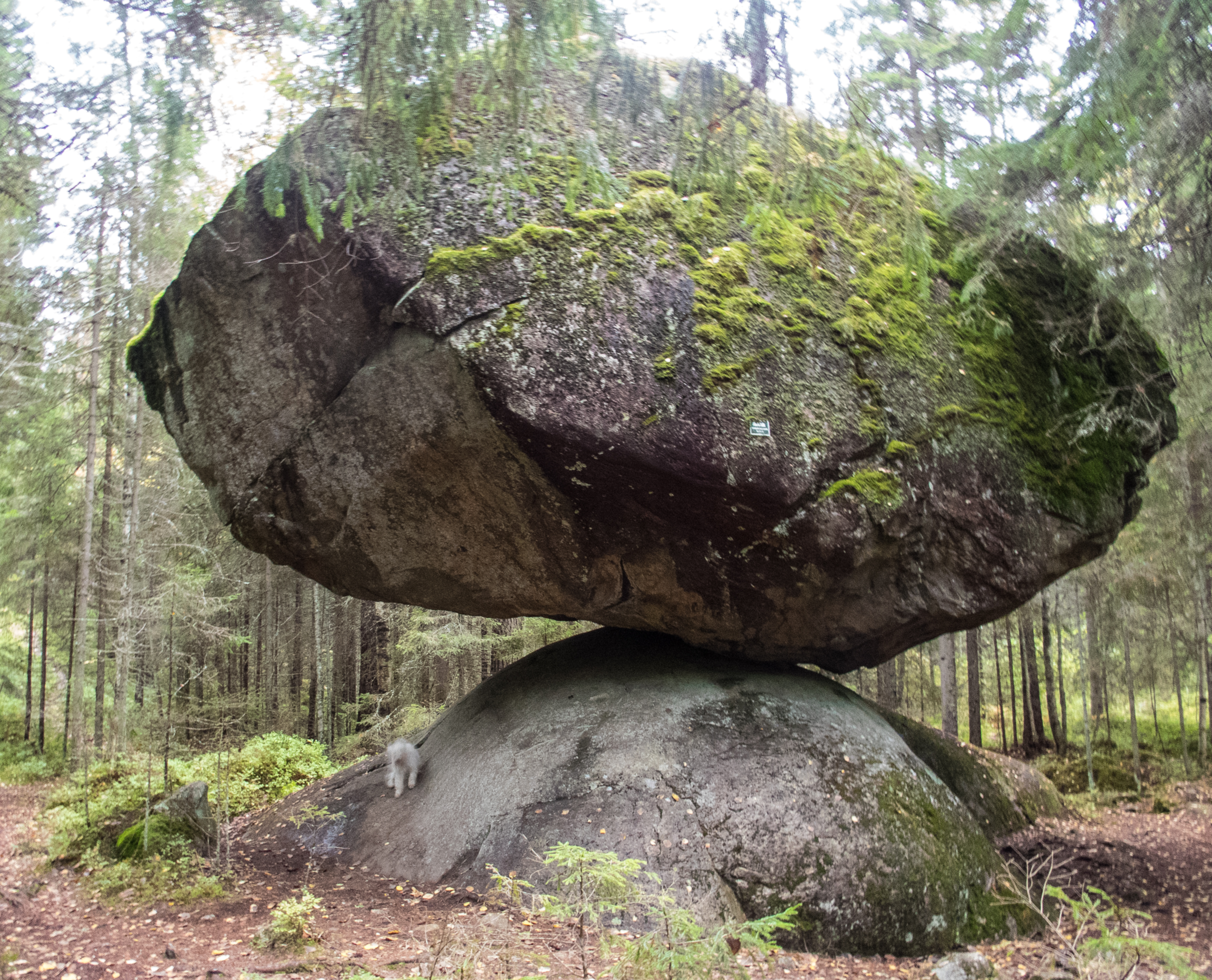
A balancing rock called Kummakivi (literally "strange stone")

Rocks are composed primarily of grains of minerals, which are crystalline solids formed from atoms chemically bonded into an orderly structure. Some rocks also contain mineraloids, which are rigid, mineral-like substances, such as volcanic glass,that lack crystalline structure. The types and abundance of minerals in a rock are determined by the manner in which it was formed.

Most rocks contain silicate minerals, compounds that include silica tetrahedra in their crystal lattice, and account for about one-third of all known mineral species and about 95% of the earth's crust. The proportion of silica in rocks and minerals is a major factor in determining their names and properties.

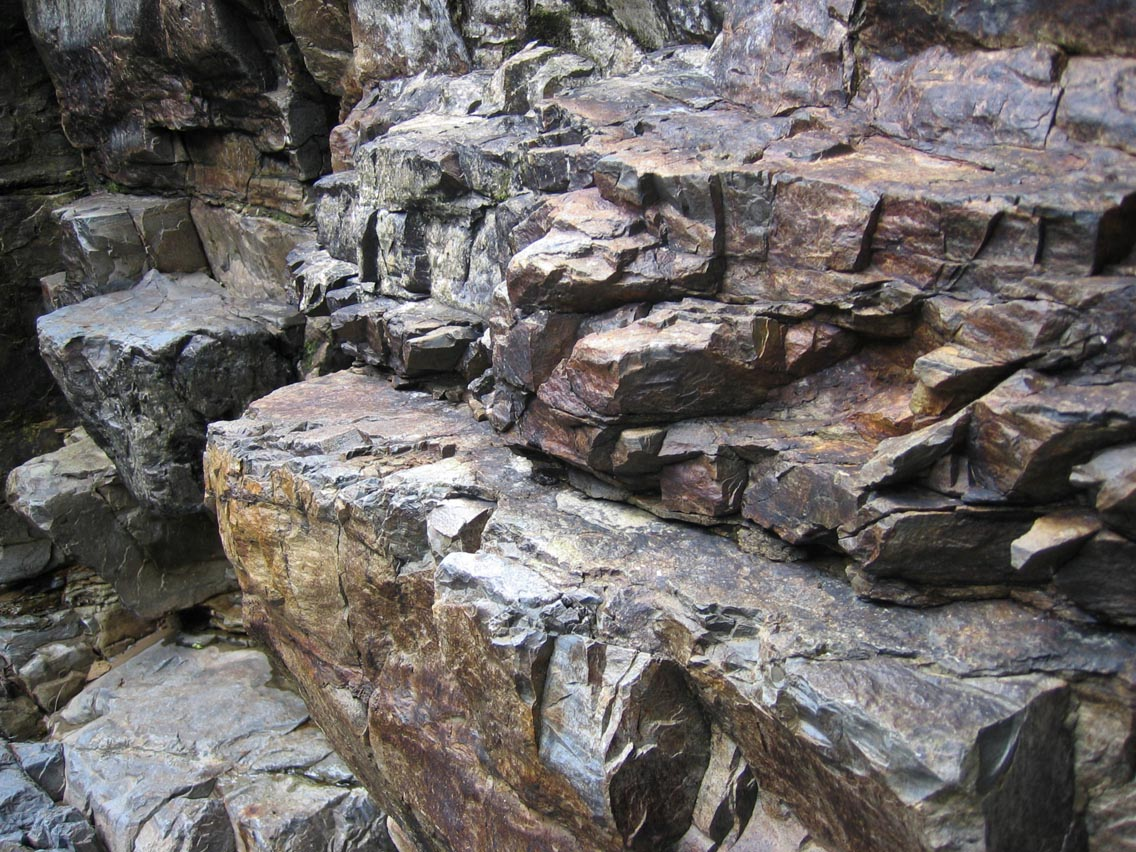
Rock outcrop along a mountain creek near Orosí, Costa Rica.

Rocks are classified according to characteristics such as mineral and chemical composition, permeability, texture of the constituent particles, and particle size. These physical properties are the result of the processes that formed the rocks. Over the course of time, rocks can be transformed from one type into another, as described by a geological model called the rock cycle. This transformation produces three general classes of rock: igneous, sedimentary and metamorphic.

These three classes are subdivided into many groups. There are, however, no hard-and-fast boundaries between allied rocks. By increase or decrease in the proportions of their minerals, they pass through gradations from one to the other; the distinctive structures of one kind of rock may thus be traced, gradually merging into those of another. Hence the definitions adopted in rock names simply correspond to selected points in a continuously graduated series.

=== Igneous rock ===
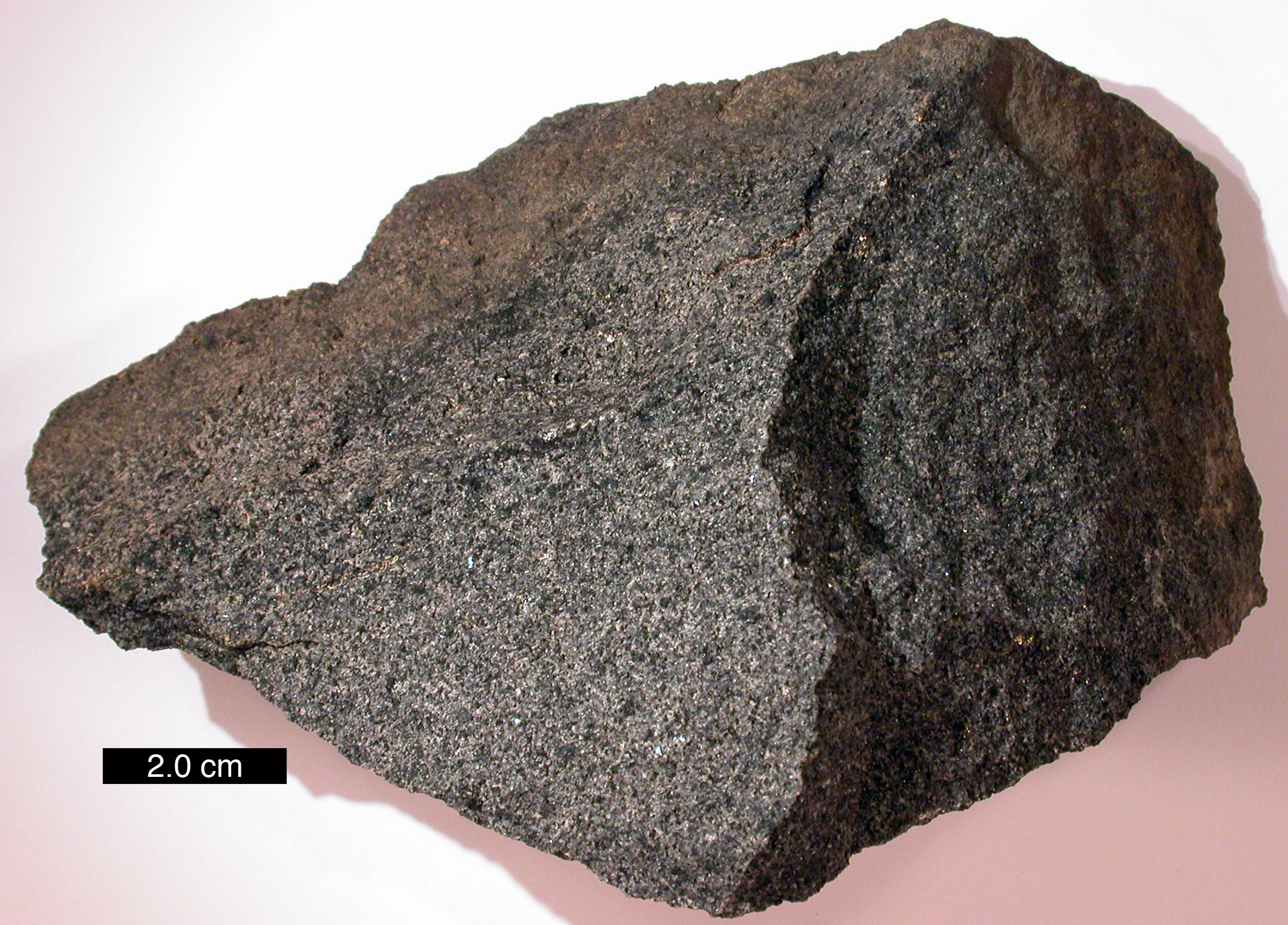
Sample of igneous gabbro

Igneous rock (derived from the Latin word igneus, meaning of fire, from ignis meaning fire) is formed through the cooling and solidification of magma or lava. This magma may be derived from partial melts of pre-existing rocks in either a planet's mantle or crust. Typically, the melting of rocks is caused by one or more of three processes: an increase in temperature, a decrease in pressure, or a change in composition.

Igneous rocks are divided into two main categories:

- Plutonic or intrusive rocks result when magma cools and crystallizes slowly within the Earth's crust. A common example of this type is granite.
- Volcanic or extrusive rocks result from magma reaching the surface either as lava or fragmental ejecta, forming minerals such as pumice or basalt.

Magmas tend to become richer in silica as they rise towards the Earth's surface, a process called magma differentiation. This occurs both because minerals low in silica crystallize out of the magma as it begins to cool (Bowen's reaction series) and because the magma assimilates some of the crustal rock through which it ascends (country rock), and crustal rock tends to be high in silica. Silica content is thus the most important chemical criterion for classifying igneous rock. The content of alkali metal oxides is next in importance.

About 65% of the Earth's crust by volume consists of igneous rocks. Of these, 66% are basalt and gabbro, 16% are granite, and 17% granodiorite and diorite. Only 0.6% are syenite and 0.3% are ultramafic. The oceanic crust is 99% basalt, which is an igneous rock of mafic composition. Granite and similar rocks, known as granitoids, dominate the continental crust.

=== Sedimentary rock ===
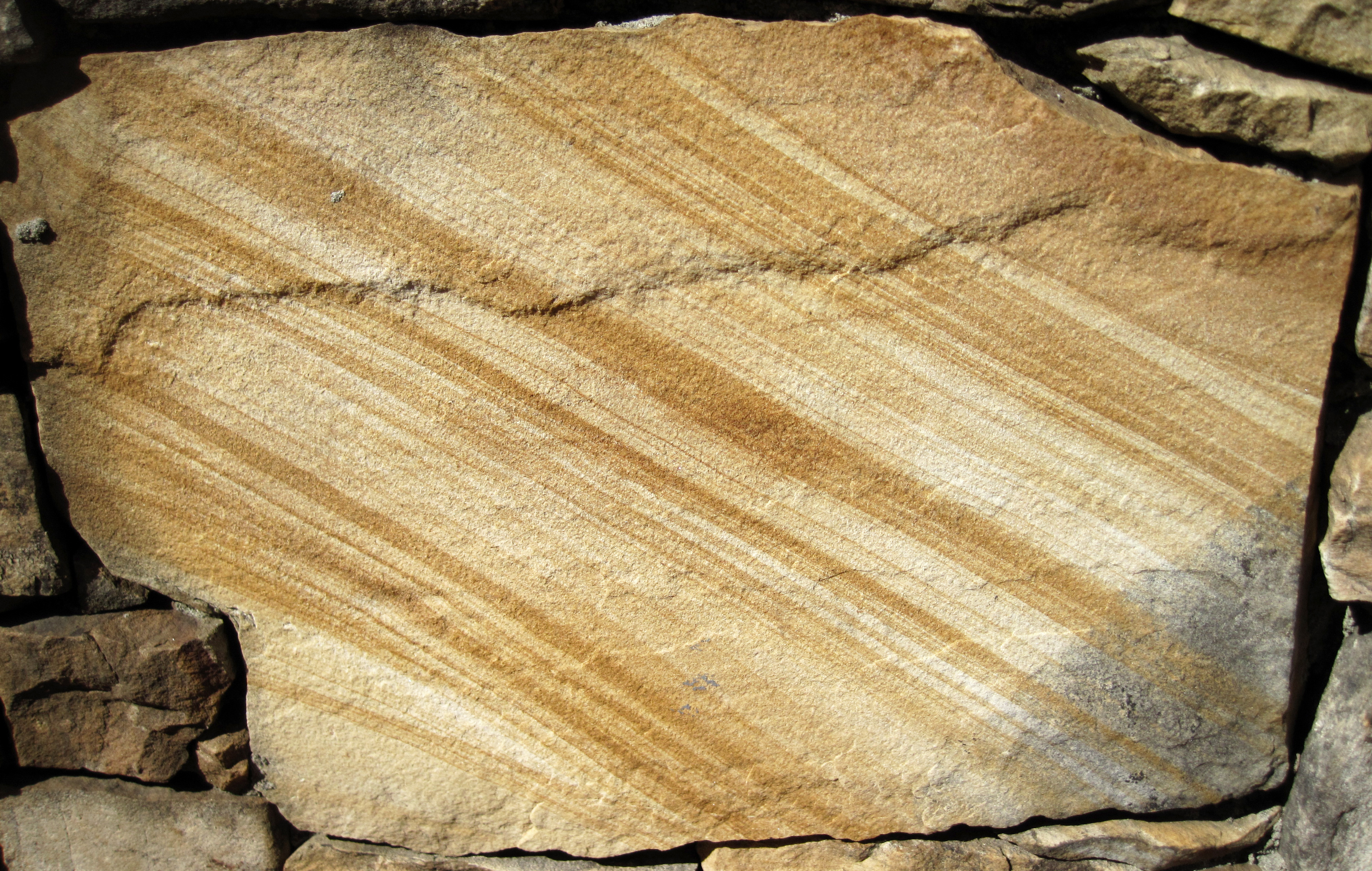
Sedimentary sandstone with iron oxide bands

Sedimentary rocks are formed at the earth's surface by the accumulation and cementation of fragments of earlier rocks, minerals, and organisms or as chemical precipitates and organic growths in water (sedimentation). This process causes clastic sediments (pieces of rock) or organic particles (detritus) to settle and accumulate or for minerals to chemically precipitate (evaporite) from a solution. The particulate matter then undergoes compaction and cementation at moderate temperatures and pressures (diagenesis).

Before being deposited, sediments are formed by weathering of earlier rocks by erosion in a source area and then transported to the place of deposition by water, wind, ice, mass movement or glaciers (agents of denudation). About 7.9% of the crust by volume is composed of sedimentary rocks, with 82% of those being shales, while the remainder consists of 6% limestone and 12% sandstone and arkoses. Sedimentary rocks often contain fossils. Sedimentary rocks form under the influence of gravity and typically are deposited in horizontal or near horizontal layers or strata, and may be referred to as stratified rocks.

Sediment and the particles of clastic sedimentary rocks can be further classified by grain size. The smallest sediments are clay, followed by silt, sand, and gravel. Some systems include cobbles and boulders as measurements.

=== Metamorphic rock ===
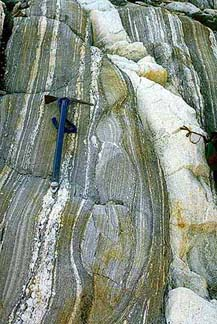
Metamorphic banded gneiss

Metamorphic rocks are formed by subjecting any rock type—sedimentary rock, igneous rock or another older metamorphic rock—to different temperature and pressure conditions than those in which the original rock was formed. This process is called metamorphism, meaning to "change in form". The result is a profound change in physical properties and chemistry of the stone. The original rock, known as the protolith, transforms into other mineral types or other forms of the same minerals, by recrystallization. The temperatures and pressures required for this process are always higher than those found at the Earth's surface: temperatures greater than 150 to 200 °C and pressures greater than 1500 bars. This occurs, for example, when continental plates collide. Metamorphic rocks compose 27.4% of the crust by volume.

The three major classes of metamorphic rock are based upon the formation mechanism. An intrusion of magma that heats the surrounding rock causes contact metamorphism—a temperature-dominated transformation. Pressure metamorphism occurs when sediments are buried deep under the ground; pressure is dominant, and temperature plays a smaller role. This is termed burial metamorphism, and it can result in rocks such as jade. Where both heat and pressure play a role, the mechanism is termed regional metamorphism. This is typically found in mountain-building regions.

Depending on the structure, metamorphic rocks are divided into two general categories. Those that possess a texture are referred to as foliated; the remainders are termed non-foliated. The name of the rock is then determined based on the types of minerals present. Schists are foliated rocks that are primarily composed of lamellar minerals such as micas. A gneiss has visible bands of differing lightness, with a common example being the granite gneiss. Other varieties of foliated rock include slates, phyllites, and mylonite. Familiar examples of non-foliated metamorphic rocks include marble, soapstone, and serpentine. This branch contains quartzite—a metamorphosed form of sandstone—and hornfels.

== Extraterrestrial rocks ==
Though most understanding of rocks comes from those of Earth, rocks make up many of the universe's celestial bodies. In the Solar System, Mars, Venus, and Mercury are composed of rock, as are many natural satellites, asteroids, and meteoroids. Meteorites that fall to Earth provide evidence of extraterrestrial rocks and their composition. They are typically heavier than rocks on Earth. Asteroid rocks can also be brought to Earth through space missions, such as the Hayabusa mission. Lunar rocks and Martian rocks have also been studied.

== Human use ==
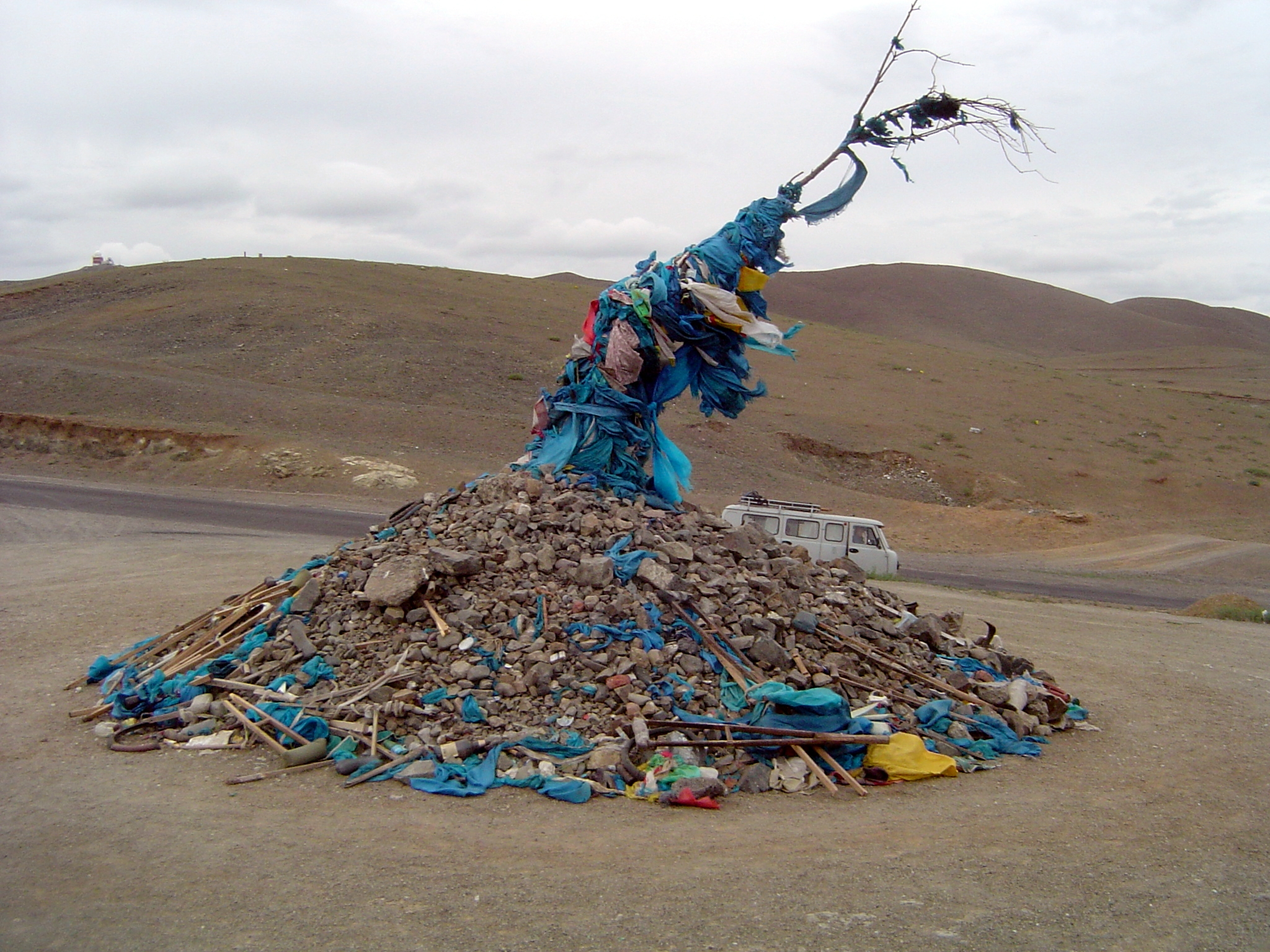
Ceremonial cairn of rocks, an ovoo, from Mongolia

The use of rock has had a huge impact on the cultural and technological development of the human race. Rock has been used by humans and other hominids for at least 2.5 million years. Lithic technology marks some of the oldest and continuously used technologies. The mining of rock for its metal content has been one of the most important factors of human advancement, and has progressed at different rates in different places, in part because of the kind of metals available from the rock of a region.

=== Anthropic rock ===
Anthropic rock is synthetic or restructured rock formed by human activity. Concrete is recognized as a human-made rock constituted of natural and processed rock and having been developed since Ancient Rome. Rock can also be modified with other substances to develop new forms, such as epoxy granite. Artificial stone has also been developed, such as Coade stone. Geologist James R. Underwood has proposed anthropic rock as a fourth class of rocks alongside igneous, sedimentary, and metamorphic.

=== Building ===
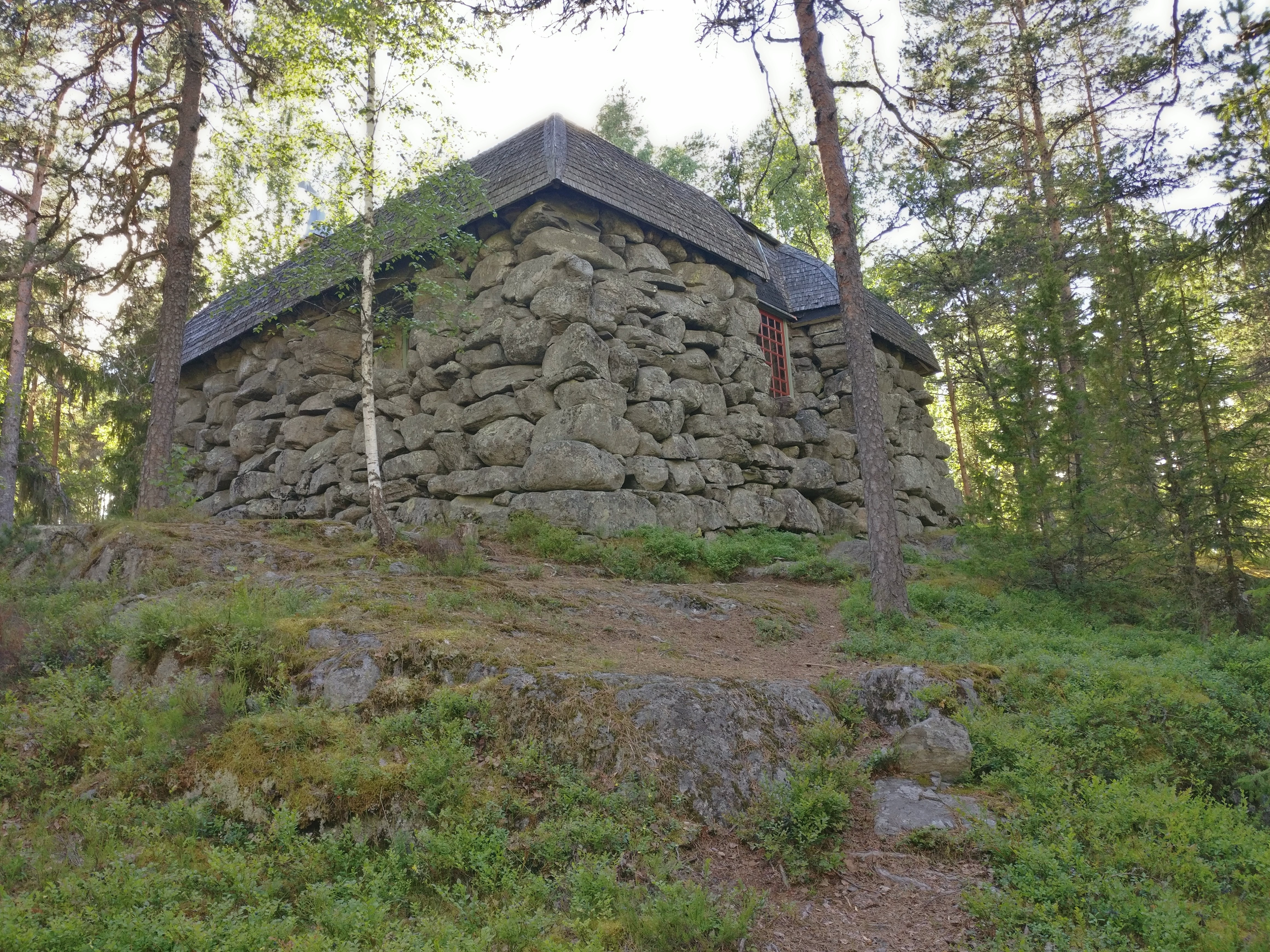
A stonehouse on the hill in Sastamala, Finland

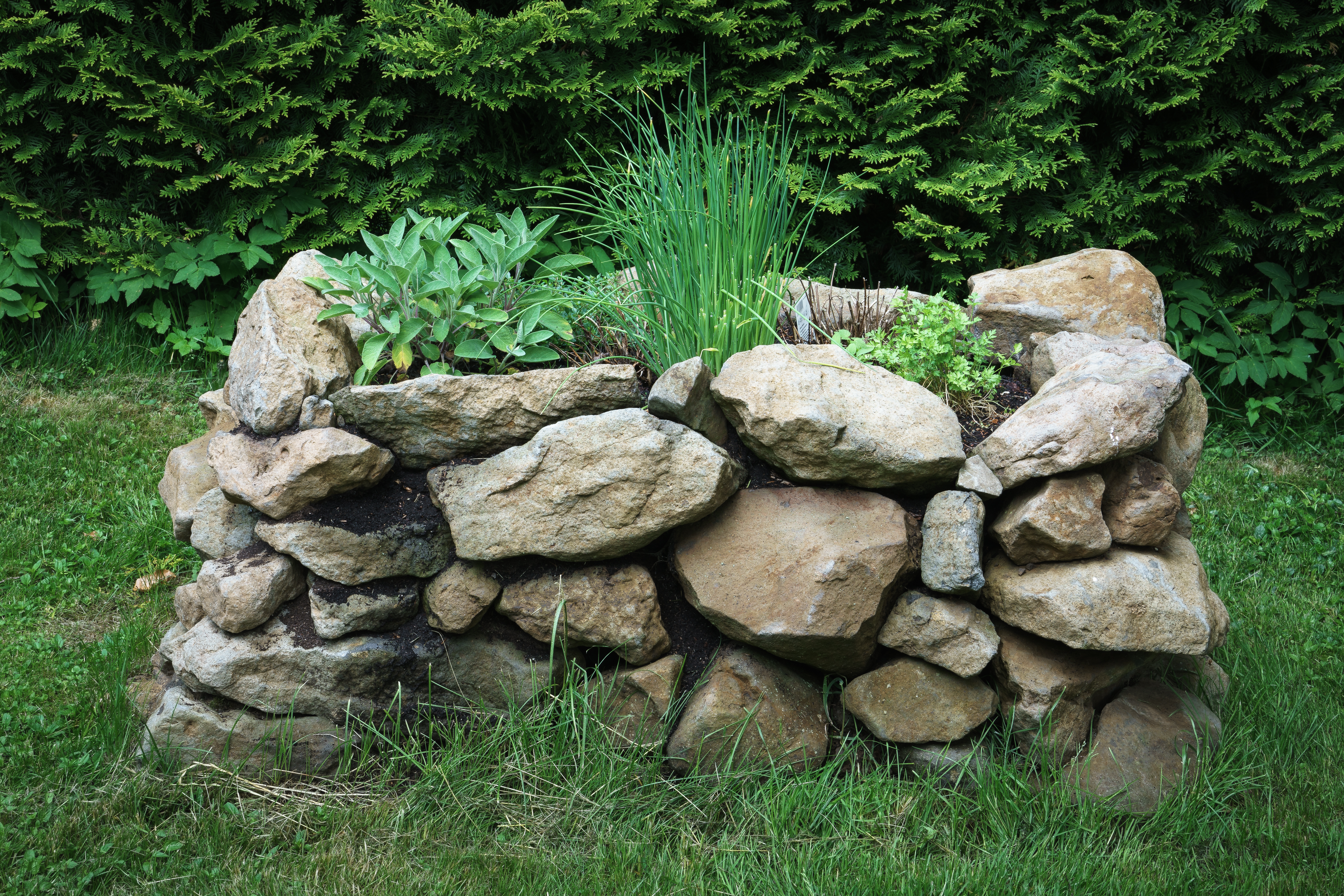
Raised garden bed with natural stones

Rock varies greatly in strength, from quartzites having a tensile strength in excess of 300 MPa to sedimentary rock so soft it can be crumbled with bare fingers (that is, it is friable). (For comparison, structural steel has a tensile strength of around 350 MPa.) Relatively soft, easily worked sedimentary rock was quarried for construction as early as 4000 BCE in Egypt, and stone was used to build fortifications in Inner Mongolia as early as 2800 BCE. The soft rock, tuff, is common in Italy, and the Romans used it for many buildings and bridges. Limestone was widely used in construction in the Middle Ages in Europe and remained popular into the 20th century.

=== Mining ===
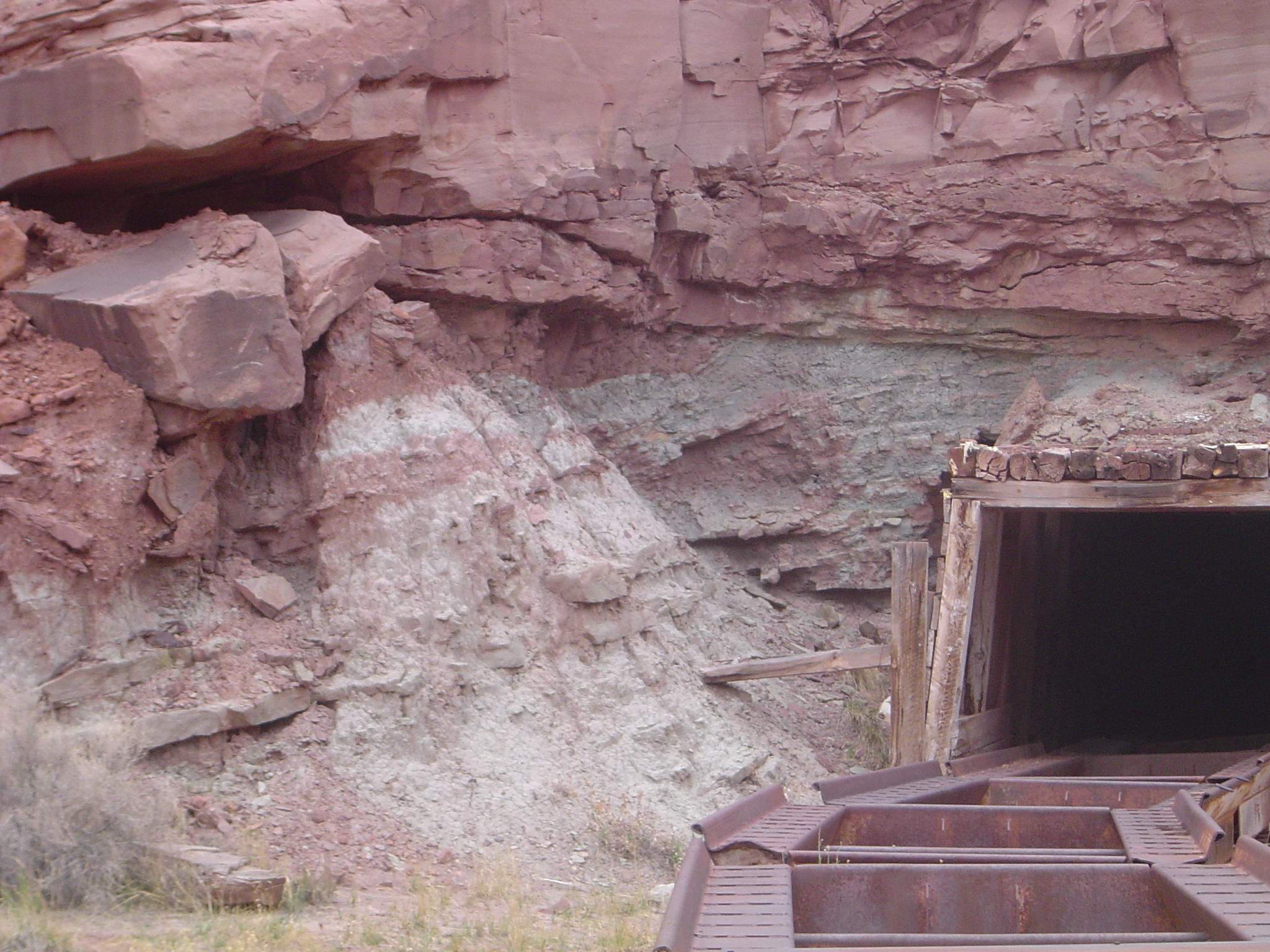
Mi Vida uranium mine near Moab, Utah

Mining is the extraction of valuable minerals or other geological materials from the earth, from an ore body, vein or seam. The term also includes the removal of soil. Materials recovered by mining include base metals, precious metals, iron, uranium, coal, diamonds, limestone, oil shale, rock salt, potash, construction aggregate and dimension stone. Mining is required to obtain any material that cannot be grown through agricultural processes, or created artificially in a laboratory or factory. Mining in a wider sense comprises extraction of any resource (e.g. petroleum, natural gas, salt or even water) from the earth.

Mining of rock and metals has been done since prehistoric times. Modern mining processes involve prospecting for mineral deposits, analysis of the profit potential of a proposed mine, extraction of the desired materials, and finally reclamation of the land to prepare it for other uses once mining ceases.

Mining processes may create negative impacts on the environment both during the mining operations and for years after mining has ceased. These potential impacts have led to most of the world's nations adopting regulations to manage negative effects of mining operations.

=== Tools ===
Stone tools have been used for millions of years by humans and earlier hominids. The Stone Age was a period of widespread stone tool usage. Early Stone Age tools were simple implements, such as hammerstones and sharp flakes. Middle Stone Age tools featured sharpened points to be used as projectile points, awls, or scrapers. Late Stone Age tools were developed with craftsmanship and distinct cultural identities. Stone tools were largely superseded by copper and bronze tools following the development of metallurgy.

== See also ==
- List of individual rocks
- Pebble – Small rock fragment
- Cobble (geology) – Clast of rock
- Boulder – Natural rock fragment larger than 10 inches
- Rock (building material) Rocks as a building material
- Geologic time scale – System that relates geologic strata to time
- Geomorphology – Scientific study of landforms
- History of Earth – Records of Earth's development
- List of rock types
- Oldest rock – Includes rocks over 4 billion years old from the Hadean Eon
- Stone industry – Place where geological material has been excavated
- Stone skipping – Skill of throwing a stone across water
- Floaters (geology) – Rock fragments detached from original outcrop
