= C15H26O6 =

The molecular formula C_{15}H_{26}O_{6} (molar mass: 302.364 g/mol) may refer to:

- Tributyrin
- Trimethylolpropane triglycidyl ether, or TMPTGE
