= Pierre Castan =

Swiss chemist (1899–1985)

Pierre Castan (born 17 August 1899 in Bern, died 12 September 1985 in Geneva) was a Swiss chemist who was one of the pioneers of epoxy resins with Paul Schlack.

Pierre Castan was promoted to the University of Geneva and was initially a chemist in the dye industry and at the Swiss Federal Institute of Viticulture in Lausanne. From 1936 he developed synthetic resins for dental prosthesis at the De Trey AG brothers in Zurich. At the same time, he developed epoxy resins (From reaction between epichlorohydrin with diphenols), which he applied for in Switzerland in 1938 (granted 1940) (without knowing of Schlack's simultaneous development in Germany). They were suitable as varnish and adhesive. Castan developed them further with several further patents in the 1940s for different applications and in different variants. In 1943, Ciba took over the patents and produced a metal adhesive (Araldit 1946). In 1950 he went to the Stella AS varnish factory in Geneva, where he became technical director. After retirement, he was director of the FATIPEC Congress in 1970 and was an honorary member of the Swiss Society of Chemical Paints and Dyes. In 1982 he received the Jaubert Prize from the University of Geneva. He died in 1985 after a long illness.

== Literature ==
- Process for the manufacture of thermosetting synthetic resins by the polymerization of alkylene oxide derivatives (US 2444333 A)
- Winfried Pötsch u.a. Lexikon bedeutender Chemiker, Harri Deutsch 1989
- Sur la glucosane
- Sur le chlorure d'α‐glucosyle et sur un nouveau disaccharide (α‐glucosido‐glucose)
