= Copper naphthenate =

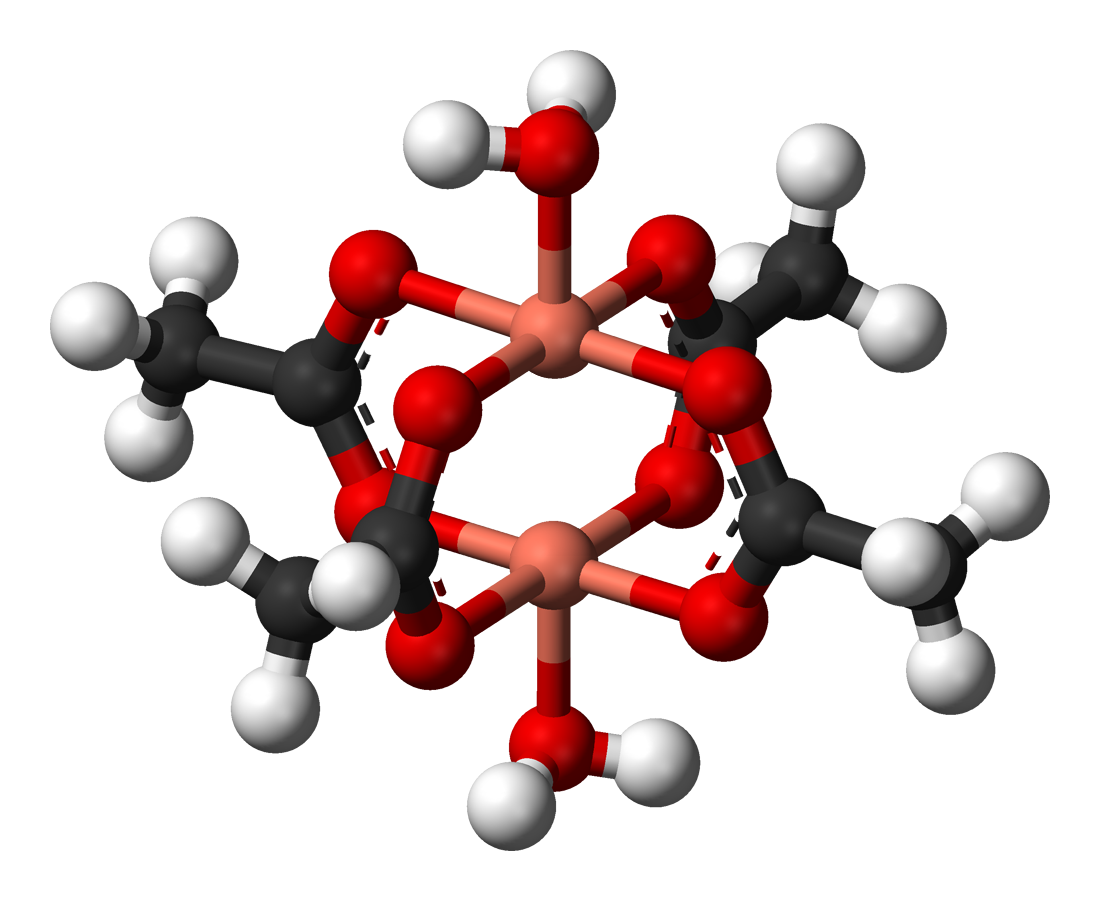
- Structure of copper(II) acetate. In copper naphthenate, the methyl groups would be replaced by longer chain, often cyclic and chiral hydrocarbons.

Names
- IUPAC names: Copper salt; Naphthenic acid
- Other names QNAP, Cunapsol, CuNap, Cuprinol

Identifiers
CAS Number	1338-02-9
3D model (JSmol)	Interactive image
ChemSpider	13645570
ECHA InfoCard	100.014.234
EC Number	29-003-00-5
PubChem CID	15607801
RTECS number	QK9100000
UNII	9J2IBN2H70
CompTox Dashboard (EPA)	DTXSID1027392
- InChI: InChI=1S/2C11H8O2.Cu/c2*12-11(13)10-6-5-8-3-1-2-4-9(8)7-10;/h2*1-7H,(H,12,13);/q;;+2/p-2 Key: OHGJVAFVIMGJTE-UHFFFAOYSA-L
- SMILES: C1=CC=C2C=C(C=CC2=C1)C(=O)[O-].C1=CC=C2C=C(C=CC2=C1)C(=O)[O-].[Cu+2]

Properties
Chemical formula	CuC_{n}H_{2n-z}O_{4} n: 10-24; z: 0, 1, 2
Molar mass	~346-782
Appearance	Blue-green amorphous solid or viscous liquid. Always formulated as a liquid solution or emulsion.
Density	1.055 g/cm^{3} (1.02 g/cm^{3} as 8% Cu solution in #2 diesel)
Boiling point	Non-volatile: > 100 °C (212 °F; 373 K)
Solubility in water	Essentially insoluble; 46 mg/L

Hazards
Flash point	> 37.8 °C (100.0 °F; 310.9 K) as solution in mineral spirits
- Except where otherwise noted, data are given for materials in their standard state (at 25 °C [77 °F], 100 kPa). Infobox references

Copper naphthenate is a copper derivative of naphthenic acid. Although commonly called salts of naphthenic acid, copper naphthenate is not ionic, but is a covalent coordination complex, hence its lipophilic character. It has the general formula Cu(RCOO)_{2}. Its structure is assumed to resemble that of copper(II) acetate.

Copper naphthenate is most widely used in wood preservation and for protecting other cellulosic materials such as textiles and cordage from damage by decay, fungi and insects. Other metal naphthenates are used as paint driers, rubber adhesion promoters, lubricant additives, and catalysts where oil solubility is required.

== Properties and composition ==
Copper naphthenate is a dark-green, amorphous glassy solid, paste or viscous liquid that is freely soluble in various organic solvents including mineral spirits, diesel fuel and other fuel oils, and creosote-petroleum mixtures.

The properties of copper naphthenate treating solutions are dependent on the type of oil used as the carrier:

- Copper naphthenate free of any solvent has a copper content ranging from 10-13% by weight, depending on the acid number/molecular weight of the naphthenic acid used.
- Copper naphthenate sold for pressure treatment of wood is typically supplied as an 8% copper (as metal) concentrate for dilution to 0.5-1.5% copper (as metal) treating solutions.
- Copper naphthenate sold at retail for consumer use is typically a 1% or 2% copper ready-to-use solution in mineral spirits or other similar solvents.
- Waterborne copper naphthenate formulations are also available as a 5% copper (as metal) concentrate and used after further dilution with water.

== Preparation ==
Copper naphthenate is commonly prepared by treatment of naphthenic acid with copper(II) compounds such as basic copper carbonate or copper hydroxide. Even copper(II) sulfate can be treated with sodium or potassium naphthenate in aqueous solutions. The reaction of copper metal with naphthenic acid, which has been used commercially, requires more forcing reaction conditions and generates excessive impurities. Less commonly practiced methods of synthesis include reaction of copper acetate with naphthenic acid, which generates acetic acid as a byproduct, and electrochemically using copper electrodes.

== Wood preservative and other uses ==
Copper naphthenate is an active ingredient used predominantly in industrial and commercial wood preservation for non-pressure (dip/brush/spray) and pressure treatments (vacuum/full cell) to protect against fungal rot, decay, termites and wood-boring insects in unfinished wood and various fabricated wood products. This preservative is also used for remedial treatments to in-service poles including internal/external surfaces at ground or below ground level via brush/trowel, mechanical injection, or bandage wrap. Wood treated with copper naphthenate is specified for exterior above ground, ground contact, below ground and fresh water contact use applications. Copper naphthenate is also used as protective wood preservative surface treatments when applied to bare seasoned wood. For this use, it is readily available to the general public and sold over-the-counter to consumers as wood protection coatings and water repellants.

Copper naphthenate has been commercially produced and industry utilized as wood preservative since its first use in Europe in 1889. It is typically formulated in hydrocarbon solvents such as diesel, heavier fuel oils, or mineral spirits, although waterborne formulations are also used to preserve dimensional lumber and in non-pressure applications such as wooden roof shakes and shingles. Copper naphthenate in oil is a heavy duty wood preservative used for utility poles, railroad crossties and bridge timbers, highway construction such as posts and guardrails, fence posts, and piles.

In addition to broad efficacy against decay fungi and wood-destroying insects, its low mammalian toxicity is a key reason why copper naphthenate has gained market acceptance as a proven effective wood preservative that is specified and used extensively for environmental reasons by utilities and railroads as a less toxic alternative to creosote, pentachlorophenol and arsenicals in poles, crossties and bridge timbers. Unlike creosote, pentachlorophenol, and arsenic-containing preservatives, copper naphthenate has been classified by the US EPA as a "General Use" (not "Restricted Use") pesticide due to its relatively benign toxicity profile, i.e., its use and application is not restricted to only by or under the direct supervision of trained and certified applicators. As such, copper naphthenate is available over the counter in ready-to-use formulations for consumer/residential use. It is also used in non-pressure applications for preserving textiles and cordage, and is widely used for remedial treatment of utility poles in service and for treating end cuts, holes, and other damage to the surface of treated wood. Copper naphthenate in both oil-borne and waterborne formulations has been adopted by the American Wood Protection Association as an AWPA-standardized wood preservative.

Commercial application for heavy duty commodities such as poles, ties and timbers is predominantly by pressure treatment. Non-pressure methods such as thermal (non-pressure) dipping of utility poles from the butt to above the ground line has also been used, particularly for naturally durable species such as western red cedar. Consumer methods of application include dip, brush or spray; specific directions for use are found on the pesticide label on the container. The color of CuN-treated wood may vary from light brown-green to dark brown depending on the type of oil and the treating process. Exposure to sunlight gives the wood a medium brown color over time.

Copper naphthenate is also used as the antimicrobial active ingredient and drying agent in FDA-approved hoof thrush treatments for horses. As an inert ingredient, copper naphthenate is used mainly in insecticide and nematicide formulations when applied to soil and/or growing crops (prior to formation of edible parts) Metal naphthenates have been used as additive driers in alkyd paints. They increase the rate of drying of the applied paint on the surface .

== Regulatory status and environmental aspects ==
The antimicrobial properties of copper compounds have long been exploited as pesticides due to their broad activity against a variety of decay fungi and wood-destroying insects, including termites. Copper naphthenate, when used as a preservative for wood and other cellulosic materials such as cotton fabric and cordage, is by definition a pesticide and thus must be registered with the U.S. Environmental Protection Agency (EPA). Copper naphthenate has been registered with EPA since October 29, 1951. The EPA PC code for copper naphthenate is 23102, and registered pesticide products may be searched under that PC code at http://ppis.ceris.purdue.edu/. Copper naphthenate is classified by EPA as a general use (i.e., a non-restricted use) pesticide by virtue of its relatively benign toxicity profile. Copper naphthenate is the only non-restricted use wood preservative in widespread use for "heavy duty" commodities such as utility poles, railroad crossties and timbers, pilings and fence posts. The general use classification also allows copper naphthenate to be sold over the counter for consumer uses such as treated wood for fences and decking, and for brush-on application for end cuts and other areas where exposed wood may be subject to insect attack or decay. Products formulated or repackaged from these compounds must be labeled for "Exterior Use Only". Treated wood materials preserved with copper naphthenate salt preservatives are intended for exterior use-site applications only; indoor installation and uses are not allowed.

Copper naphthenate, as with all metal carboxylates, readily dissociates into free metal and free acid in a reversible process, where the portion of dissociated salt present is dependent on the pH and pKa (the dissociation constant). The degree of dissociation influences the behavior of the substance in the environment because the free acid (naphthenic acid) and corresponding free metal (copper) have different solubility, adsorption, and toxicity characteristics than the undissociated salt. Carboxylate salts are found as partially dissociated products in the ambient environment at near neutral pH; in low pH environments such as the digestive tract (e.g., pH 1.2) complete dissociation of metal carboxylates will occur. Naphthenic acid is biodegradable; indigenous bacteria present in oil sands tailings can utilize naphthenic acid as a sole source of carbon, converting about 50% of the carbon into carbon dioxide.

Copper naphthenate is not listed as a hazardous air pollutant or reproductive toxin, contains no listed carcinogens, and exhibits low mammalian toxicity by oral, dermal, and inhalation routes of exposure. As with all other types of preservative treatment, wood treated with copper naphthenate is not considered a hazardous waste. Unlike the other heavy duty wood preservatives that are restricted use pesticides, neither copper naphthenate nor wastes from copper naphthenate wood treatment operations are listed as hazardous wastes.

== See also ==
- Carboxylic acid
- Organic acid
