= Durcupan =

Durcupan is a water-soluble epoxy resin produced by the Fluka subsidiary of Sigma-Aldrich. It is commonly used for embedding electron microscope samples in plastic so they may be sectioned (sliced thin) with a microtome and then imaged.

Durcupan is notable for refractive index n_{D}^{20} of 1.654, which is a very high value for epoxy resins.
