= Trimethylolpropane triglycidyl ether =

Names
- IUPAC name 2-[2,2-bis(oxiran-2-ylmethoxymethyl)butoxymethyl]oxirane
- Other names: 1-(2,3-Epoxypropoxy)-2,2-bis((2,3-epoxypropoxy)methyl)butane; 2,2′-[[2-ethyl-2-[(2-oxiranylmethoxy)methyl]-1,3-propanediyl]bis(oxymethylene)]bisoxirane; 1-(2,3-epoxypropoxy)-2,2-bis[(2,3-epoxypropoxy)methyl]butane; 2,2′-[[2-ethyl-2-[(oxiranylmethoxy)methyl]-1,3-propanediyl]bis(oxymethylene)]bisoxirane; 2,2′-[[2-Ethyl-2-[(2-oxiranylmethoxy)methyl]-1,3-propanediyl]bis(oxymethylene)]bisoxirane; 1,1,1-Trimethylolpropane triglycidyl ether

Identifiers
CAS Number	3454-29-3
3D model (JSmol)	Interactive image
ChEBI	CHEBI:189372
ChemSpider	93067
EC Number	222-384-0
PubChem CID	103015
CompTox Dashboard (EPA)	DTXSID90873907
- InChI: InChI=1S/C15H26O6/c1-2-15(9-16-3-12-6-19-12,10-17-4-13-7-20-13)11-18-5-14-8-21-14/h12-14H,2-11H2,1H3 Key: QECCQGLIYMMHCR-UHFFFAOYSA-N
- SMILES: CCC(COCC1CO1)(COCC2CO2)COCC3CO3

Properties
Chemical formula	C_{15}H_{26}O_{6}
Molar mass	302.364 g/mol

Hazards
- GHS labelling
Pictograms	(GHS05: Corrosive) (GHS07: Exclamation mark) (GHS08: Health hazard)
Signal word	Danger
Hazard statements	H315, H317, H318, H319, H334, H335, H412
Precautionary statements	P261, P264, P264+P265, P271, P272, P273, P280, P284, P302+P352, P304+P340, P305+P351+P338, P305+P354+P338, P317, P319, P321, P332+P317, P333+P313, P337+P317, P342+P316, P362+P364, P403+P233, P405, P501
- Except where otherwise noted, data are given for materials in their standard state (at 25 °C [77 °F], 100 kPa). Infobox references

Trimethylolpropane triglycidyl ether (TMPTGE) is an organic chemical in the glycidyl ether family. It has the formula C_{15}H_{26}O_{6} and the IUPAC name is 2-[2,2-bis(oxiran-2-ylmethoxymethyl)butoxymethyl]oxirane, and the CAS number 3454-29-3. It also has another CAS number of 30499-70-8 A key use is as a modifier for epoxy resins as a reactive diluent.

== Manufacture ==
Trimethylolpropane and epichlorohydrin are reacted with a Lewis acid catalyst to form a halohydrin. The next step is dehydrochlorination with sodium hydroxide. This forms the triglycidyl ether.

== Uses ==
As the molecule has 3 oxirane functionalities, a key use is modifying and reducing the viscosity of epoxy resins. These reactive diluent modified epoxy resins may then be further formulated into CASE applications: Coatings, Adhesives, Sealants, Elastomers. The use of the diluent does effect mechanical properties and microstructure of epoxy resins. It produces epoxy coatings with high impact resistance Polymer systems with shape memory may also be produced with this particular molecule. Fluoropolymers have also been produced with the material via a photoinitiated mechanism. Production of biocompatible materials is also possible.

== See also ==
- Epoxide
- Glycidol
- Glycerol triglycidyl ether

== External websites ==
- Hexion Poly-functional Modifiers
- Denacol epoxy diluent range
- Cargill Reactive diluents
