= Epoxy granite =

Mixture of epoxy and granite

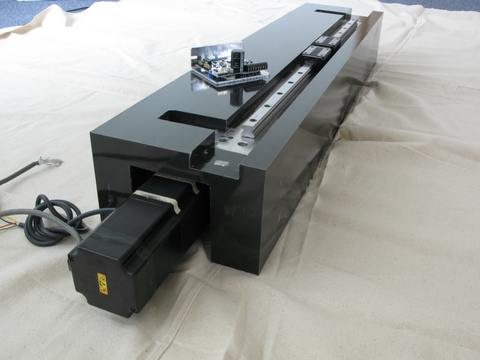
Mineral casting

Epoxy granite, also known as synthetic granite, is a polymer matrix composite and is a mixture of epoxy and granite commonly used as an alternative material for machine tool bases. Epoxy granite is used instead of cast iron and steel for improved vibration damping, longer tool life, and lower assembly cost, and thus better properties for stabilizing and housing machines.

== Machine tool base ==
Machine tools and other high-precision machines rely upon high stiffness, long-term stability, and excellent damping characteristics of the base material for their static and dynamic performance. The most widely used materials for these structures are cast iron, welded steel fabrications, and natural granite. Due to the lack of long-term stability and very poor damping properties, steel fabricated structures are seldom used where high precision is required. Good-quality cast iron that is stress-relieved and annealed will give the structure dimensional stability, and can be cast into complex shapes, but needs an expensive machining process to form precision surfaces after casting. Natural granite has a higher damping capacity than cast iron, but similarly to cast iron can be labor-intensive and expensive to machine and finish. The traditional market for epoxy granite is to replace iron and steel in these applications.

== Process ==
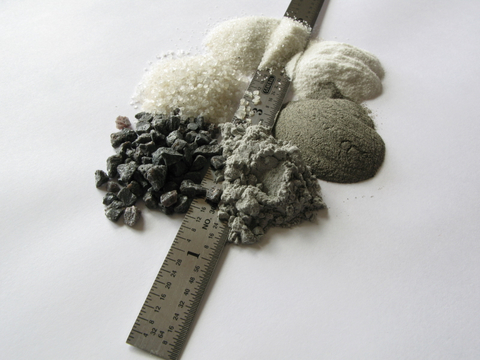
Epoxy granite aggregate

Precision granite castings are produced by mixing granite aggregates (which are crushed, washed, and dried) with an epoxy resin system at ambient temperature (i.e., cold curing process). Quartz aggregate filler can also be used in the composition. Vibratory compaction during the molding process tightly packs the aggregate together. Mechanical and thermo-mechanical properties can be improved further if fiber is used as well as the granite. Other resins in addition to the epoxy may also be used instead of fibers to improve properties such as water absorption. If porosity is controlled, damping effects can be improved further. Threaded inserts, steel plates, and coolant pipes can be cast-in during the casting process. To achieve an even higher degree of versatility, linear rails, ground slide-ways, and motor mounts can be replicated or grouted-in, therefore eliminating the need for any post-cast machining.

== Other definitions ==
Epoxy resins and granite, specifically waste granite dust, may be used in other applications such as floor coatings. Waste granite filings are produced in the mining industry, and the low density means this can be easily dispersed by winds and thus distributed in the environment. Research is being done on innovative solutions such as using waste granite powders in epoxy resins and designing binders for coatings based on this.

== Advantages ==
Epoxy granite materials have an internal damping factor up to ten times better than cast iron, up to three times better than natural granite, and up to thirty times better than steel fabricated structure. Unlike iron and steel and alloys, which are vulnerable to corrosion without the application of paints, epoxy granite is generally resistant to most common solvents, acids, alkalis, and cutting fluids. The method of casting compared to steel allows easier inclusion of inserts etc. and thus reduced machining of the finished casting and reduced assembly time by incorporating multiple components into one casting. Polymer cast resins use very little energy to produce, and the casting process is done at room temperature.
