= Paul Schlack =

German chemist (1897–1987)

- Born: 22 December 1897; Stuttgart, Germany
- Died: 19 August 1987 (aged 89); Leinfelden-Echterdingen, Germany
- Education: Technical University of Stuttgart
- Known for: Perlon (Nylon 6)
- Scientific career
- Workplaces: Technical University of Stuttgart

Paul Schlack (22 December 1897 – 19 August 1987) was a German chemist. He completed his studies at the Technical University of Stuttgart in 1921 and worked as a research chemist in Copenhagen for a year, before returning to Stuttgart. He received his PhD in 1924. Around this time he developed a keen interest in amide chemistry. He synthesized Nylon 6, widely known by its tradename Perlon, on 29 January 1938 whilst working for IG Farben.
