= Adhesion promoter =

Family of chemical substances

Adhesion promoters are a family of chemical substances used as additives aiming to improve the bonds between two substrates (typically an organic polymer with an inorganic substrate), which would not otherwise adhere due to different chemical properties. These promoters work by forming stable chemical interactions, such as covalent or hydrogen bonds at the interface, effectively stabilizing the system. They are used in printing inks, adhesives, plastics & composites, automotive industry and electronics.

== Chemistry ==
Adhesion promoters include a wide range of chemical families, which are selected according to application conditions. The fundamental concept, is that different chemical natures imply different compatibility and final properties depending on the substrate and organic polymers chemical natures. These additives share a similar structure: a metallic or metalloid center (such as silicon, zirconium, titanium, aluminum, or others) that will be responsible for the inorganic substrate bonding, and an organofunctional group, responsible for the inorganic interactions. They can be classified as reactive or non-reactive depending whether they possess a reactive group or not. In addition, they are called compatibilizers when they are used to compatibilize two immiscible organic polymers, they are called coupling agents when they are used to compatibilize a polymeric system and a filler (inorganic).

=== Organosilanes ===
Silane coupling agents are denoted by the general monomeric structure X-R-Si-(OR)_{3}, where R is an aliphatic or aromatic group, X is a reactive organofunctional group, such as an amine, epoxide, isocyanate, thiol and vinyl group to name a few. While OR represents a hydrolyzable group, for example, a methoxy, ethoxy or acetoxy group. This kind of promoters has been used extensively as additives and primers for adhesives and sealants to improve adhesion, compounding properties and as crosslinking agent. Oligomeric versions of organosilanes are obtained via polycondensation from the monomers and have been regarded as a safer alternative to the classical monomeric versions. As oligomers have a higher molecular weight, their boiling points are higher consequentially reducing their VOC (volatile organic compounds) index, resulting in a safer labelling and logistic advantages.

=== Titanates and zirconates ===
Titanates and zirconates are organometals compounds with excellent adhesion promoting properties, they are used with critical substrates such as glass, metals and ceramics where adhesion is difficult to obtain. The general structure of these organometals can be represented as (RO)_{n}-Me-(-O-X-R'-Y)_{4-n}, where Me represents the metallic atom (Zr or Ti). Based on this, we can see that there are some similarities as well as differences compared to organosilanes, as the reaction mechanisms of these two compounds are different: titanium- and zirconium-based adhesion promoters do not need water to react, unlike organosilanes, which need water for the hydrolysis reaction. In fact, these organometals chemically bridge to surface protons through solvolysis. Many fillers have surface protons available, some examples are: carbonates (CaCO_{3}), nitrates, carbon, boron and metal powders, which are typically non-reactive towards organosilanes, placing titanium- and zirconium-based adhesion promoters as a more versatile solution.

=== Chlorinated polypropylene resins ===
Chlorinated polypropylene resins (CPO) are a group of polymers obtained by halogenation of polypropylene (PP) with chlorine. These polymers are soluble in toluene and halogenated hydrocarbons and can be classified as low, medium or high chlorine content, depending on the final application; for example, high content chlorinated polypropylene is widely used in fireproof coating and paints, while lower content resins are mostly used in inks. Their use as adhesion promoters is widely known in the automotive industry, specifically, from the mid 1970s, metallic car bumpers were starting to be replaced by thermolplastic olefins (TPO) thanks to the intrinsic advantages of these materials: recyclability, cost, weight reduction and better mechanical properties. CPOs are usually mixed with other resins and pigments, partially acting as levelling agent. Many studies tried to characterize a model, but the results have shown that the adhesion mechanism is strongly influenced by many factors such as the chemistry of the topcoat, the CPO used and the properties of the polypropylene substrate.

== See also ==
- Organosilane
- Silicone sealant
- Thermoplastic olefin
- Filler (materials)
- Surface energy
- Adhesion
