= Bis(2-ethylhexyl) terephthalate =

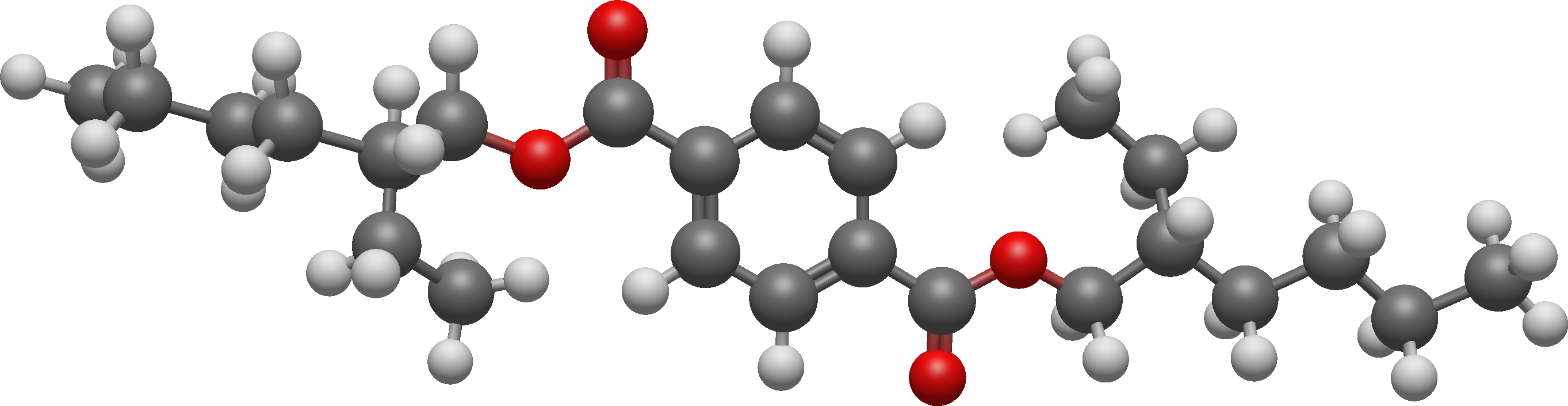

Names
- IUPAC name Bis(2-ethylhexyl) benzene-1,4-dicarboxylate
- Other names Dioctyl Terephthalate (archaic); Bis(2-ethylhexyl) terephthalate; Di(ethylhexyl) terephthalate; 1,4-Benzenedicarboxylic acid bis(2-ethylhexyl) ester

Identifiers
CAS Number	6422-86-2
3D model (JSmol)	Interactive image
Abbreviations	DEHT, DOTP
ChemSpider	21471
ECHA InfoCard	100.026.524
EC Number	229-176-9
MeSH	C053316
PubChem CID	22932
UNII	4VS908W98L
CompTox Dashboard (EPA)	DTXSID7027625
- InChI: InChI=1S/C24H38O4/c1-5-9-11-19(7-3)17-27-23(25)21-13-15-22(16-14-21)24(26)28-18-20(8-4)12-10-6-2/h13-16,19-20H,5-12,17-18H2,1-4H3
- SMILES: O=C(OCC(CC)CCCC)c1ccc(C(=O)OCC(CC)CCCC)cc1

Properties
Chemical formula	C_{24}H_{38}O_{4}
Molar mass	390.564 g·mol^{−1}
Appearance	Clear viscous liquid
Density	0.984 g/mL
Melting point	−63.5 °C
Boiling point	400 °C (752 °F; 673 K)

Hazards
- Occupational safety and health (OHS/OSH)
Main hazards	Non-toxic
- Lethal dose or concentration (LD, LC)
LD_{50} (median dose)	5000 mg/kg (rats, orally)
- Except where otherwise noted, data are given for materials in their standard state (at 25 °C [77 °F], 100 kPa). Infobox references

Bis(2-ethylhexyl) terephthalate, commonly abbreviated DEHT (Dioctyl terephthalate or DOTP), is an organic compound with the formula C_{6}H_{4}(CO_{2}C_{8}H_{17})_{2}. It is a diester of terephthalic acid and the branched-chain 2-ethylhexanol, which is often generically referred to as octyl. This colorless viscous liquid is used for softening PVC plastics and is known for chemical similarity to general purpose phthalates such as DEHP and DINP, but without any negative regulatory pressure. It possesses very good plasticizing properties and may be used as a direct replacement for DEHP and DINP in many applications.

== Production ==
One method of manufacture entails the transesterification of dimethyl terephthalate with 2-ethylhexanol:

C_{6}H_{4}(CO)_{2}(OCH_{3})_{2} + 2 C_{8}H_{17}OH → C_{6}H_{4}(CO_{2} C_{8}H_{17})_{2} + 2CH_{3}OH

A second method of manufacture is a direct esterification of terephthalic acid with 2-ethylhexanol:

C_{6}H_{4}(CO_{2}H)_{2} + 2 C_{8}H_{17}OH → C_{6}H_{4}(CO_{2} C_{8}H_{17})_{2} + 2H_{2}O

== Use ==
DEHT is a general purpose plasticizer that is considered safer than ortho-phthalate plasticizers due to its reduced toxicity profile. The terephthalates exhibit none of the peroxisome proliferation of liver enzymes that some ortho-phthalates have shown in several studies. It has uses in applications like extrusion, calendering, injection molding, rotational molding, dip molding, slush molding and coating.

== Alternative plasticizers ==
Several plasticizers offer similar technical properties to DEHT. These alternatives include phthalates such as DINP, DOP, DPHP, DIDP as well as non-phthalates such as DINCH and citrate esters.

== Possible health effects ==
According to a panel appointed by the French Agency for the Safety of Health Products (ANSM), there is very little clinical assessment data regarding the toxicity, migration from Medical Devices, and population exposure of alternative plasticizers (e.g. DEHT/DOTP) and their metabolites. The French government report concludes: "The presently available information indicates that DEHTP is not expected to pose any health or environmental risks. DEHTP is not considered as toxic for reproduction and no alert was found on potential endocrine disruption properties of the substance."

Researchers from Korea state that: "DEHT, a phthalate [sic] ester stoichiometrically eqivaluent [sic] to DEHP, has been shown to have potential reproductive and developmental toxicity." The NOAELs quoted are actually quite high, indicating the potential for reproductive toxicity is low. The same paper further states: "The ability of DEHT to induce anti-androgenic effects in male offspring was assessed by giving pregnant rats 750 mg/kg/d DEHT; no changes were observed." And further: "Results of a uterotrophic assay in which immature females were given up to 2,000 mg/kg/d DEHT indicate that this compound does not possess estrogenic activity."
