= C16H22O4 =

The molecular formula C_{16}H_{22}O_{4} may refer to:

- Dibutyl phthalate, an organic compound commonly used plasticizer
- Diisobutyl phthalate, an odorless plasticizer
- Propofol hemisuccinate
