= Consumer Product Safety Improvement Act of 2008 =

2008 U.S. law

Consumer Product Safety Improvement Act
- Other short titles: Consumer Product Safety Improvement Act of 2008
- Long title: An Act to establish consumer product safety standards and other safety requirements for children's products and to reauthorize and modernize the Consumer Product Safety Commission.
- Nicknames: Danny Keysar Child Product Safety Notification Act
- Enacted by: the 110th United States Congress
- Effective: August 14, 2008

Citations
- Public law: Pub. L. 110–314 (text) (PDF)
- Statutes at Large: 122 Stat. 3016

Codification
- Titles amended: 15 U.S.C.: Commerce and Trade
- U.S.C. sections amended: 15 U.S.C. ch. 30 § 1278a; 15 U.S.C. ch. 47 §§ 2051 et seq.

Legislative history
- Introduced in the House as H.R. 4040 by Bobby Rush (D–IL) on November 1, 2007; Committee consideration by; House Energy and Commerce Subcommittee on Commerce, Trade and Consumer Protection; Senate Appropriations Subcommittee on Financial Services and General Government; Passed the House on December 19, 2007 (407-0); Passed the Senate on March 6, 2008 (56-39, in lieu of S. 2663); Reported by the joint conference committee on July 29, 2008; agreed to by the House on July 30, 2008 (424-1) and by the Senate on July 30, 2008 (89-3); Signed into law by President George W. Bush on August 14, 2008

The Consumer Product Safety Improvement Act of 2008 (CPSIA) is a United States law signed on August 14, 2008 by President George W. Bush.

The law increased the budget of the Consumer Product Safety Commission (CPSC), imposes new testing and documentation requirements, and sets new acceptable levels of several substances. It imposes new requirements on manufacturers of apparel, shoes, personal care products, accessories and jewelry, home furnishings, bedding, toys, electronics and video games, books, school supplies, educational materials and science kits. The Act also increases fines and specifies jail time for some violations.

This act was seen in part as controversial because of its impact to many types of businesses.

== Legislative history ==
The bill was sponsored by Congressman Bobby Rush (D-Ill.). On December 19, 2007, the U.S. House approved the bill 407–0. On March 6, 2008, the U.S. Senate approved the bill 79–13.

A previous, less sweeping bill, the Lead-Free Toys Act (H.R. 3473, sponsored by Representative Henry Waxman), was incorporated into this act. The earlier bill was prompted by various scandals over high lead content in toys, including a December 2006 report at Waxman's behest showing high lead levels in items sold in U.S. Capitol gift shops.

== Provisions ==
=== Budget authorization ===
The law increased the CPSC budget authorization from $80 million in 2008 to $136 million in 2014. It also increased staffing to at least 500 personnel by 2013.

=== Targeted industries ===
It is targeted mostly toward "children's products", which are defined as any consumer product designed or intended primarily for children 12 years of age or younger.

There are also new rules governing all-terrain vehicles (ATVs).

It also affects any product that is subject to anything the CPSC regulates by requiring certificates of conformance which state that the product was tested to conform to the regulations it is subject to.

=== Definition of a children's product ===
The law defines a "children's product" as a consumer product designed or intended primarily for children 12 years of age or younger. In determining whether a consumer product is primarily intended for a child 12 years of age or younger, the following factors will be considered:

1. A statement by the manufacturer about the intended use of the product, including a label on the product, if such statement is reasonable.
2. Whether the product is represented in its packaging, display, promotion, or advertising as appropriate for use by children 12 years of age or younger.
3. Whether the product is commonly recognized by consumers as being intended for use by a child 12 years of age or younger.
4. The Age Determination Guidelines issued by the Commission staff in September 2002, and any successor to such guidelines.

See 15 USC 2052 See also 16 CFR 1200.2(a) For the CPSC's detailed analysis about the four factors, see 16 CFR 1200.2(c)

=== Testing and exposure levels ===
==== Lead ====
The legislation reduces the limit of lead allowed in surface coatings or paint to 90 ppm (from the current limit of 600 ppm) effective on August 14, 2009. The legislation reduces the amount of total lead content in children's product substrates to:

- 600 ppm by February 10, 2009.
- 300 ppm by August 14, 2009.
- 100 ppm by August 14, 2011.

The Falvey Opinion (named for Cheryl Falvey, General Counsel for the CPSC) issued on September 12, 2008 stated that these limits would be retroactively applied to products on retailer's shelves on the dates indicated.

==== Phthalates ====
As of February 10, 2009, it shall be unlawful for any person to manufacture for sale, distribute in commerce, or import any children's toy or childcare article that contains the phthalates DEHP, DBP, or BBP at levels higher than 0.1 percent.

The legislation bans from any children's toy that can be put in a child's mouth or childcare articles phthalates DINP, DIDP, and DnOP at levels higher than 0.1% on an interim basis until a report from the Chronic Hazard Advisory Panel (CHAP) is received, after which the CPSC can continue the prohibition by rule.

CPSC General Counsel Falvey provided an advisory opinion on October 17, 2008 that the phthalate ban does not apply to children's footwear. Falvey provided an additional opinion on November 17, 2008 that the ban does not apply to wearing apparel, but does apply to toy costumes, bibs, sleepwear. Notably in its distinction from the lead ruling of September 12, 2008, the phthalate ban will apply to articles manufactured on or after February 10, 2009. However, the decision was challenged by the Natural Resources Defense Council (NRDC) and Public Citizen in the New York Southern District Court and set aside by Judge Paul Gardephe on February 5, 2009.

=== Mandatory testing ===
The legislation requires that every manufacturer of a product subject to a consumer product safety rule will provide a "General Conformity Certificate" (GCC) to certify, based on unit testing or a reasonable testing program, that the product complies with all safety rules. This requirement was imposed on every product manufactured on or after November 12, 2008. The certificate must:

1. Be in English.
2. List the name, address, and phone number of the manufacturer, importer, and/or private labeler issuing the certificate and any third party testing facility.
3. List the date and place of manufacture and date and place of testing.
4. List the contact information of the records keeper.
5. List each applicable rule, standard, and ban.

These certificates must accompany the product through the distribution chain through the retailer. They must be available to the CPSC during any inspection.

Children's products are singled out for third party testing by this Act. A schedule for testing is found in Section 102(a)(3)(B) and shows:

Test standard	Publication of accreditation procedure	Third party testing required
Lead paint	September 22, 2008	December 21, 2008
Cribs and pacifiers	October 22, 2008	January 20, 2009
Small parts	November 17, 2008	February 15, 2009
Metal jewelry	December 2008	March 2009
Baby bouncers, walkers, and jumpers	March 2009	June 2009
300 ppm lead content	May 2009	August 2009 (stayed until 2/10/11)
CPSC children's product safety rules	June 2009	September 2009

The third party testing requirement for lead content was originally set by the CPSIA at 600 ppm, but dropped to 300 ppm in August, 2009. However, these lead content testing requirements were stayed by the CPSC in January 2009 until February 10, 2010. In December 2009, this stay of enforcement was further extended until February 10, 2011. In both cases, the CPSC cited a need to implement further rulemaking and to give manufacturers more time to comply. On October 9, 2011 CSPC passed final regulations requiring third-party safety testing for children's products. These new regulations go into effect 15 months after publication in the Federal Register. The actual date for compliance as publish for compliance will be February 8, 2013 for their own Product Testing and Certification Program.

In a section of the Act known as the Danny Keysar Child Product Safety Notification Act, mandatory standards are required for infant and toddler durable products, cribs cannot be sold that don't meet current standards and all infant and toddler durable products must have product registration cards. Beginning August 14, 2009, children's products must be marked by a permanent distinguishing mark or label that indicates the manufacturer, cohort (batch), and any other mark necessary to trace the product.

=== Whistleblower protections ===
The purpose of the Act's whistleblower provision is to protect employees who do the right thing by speaking up when they believe their employer has violated a consumer product safety law. Specifically, if employees of a manufacturer, private labeler, distributor, or retailer of consumer products, may not have their employer retaliate against them for reporting potential violations of consumer product safety laws.

Additionally, under the Act a Publicly Available Consumer Product Safety Information Database where consumers can directly report harm or merely a risk of harm officially launched on March 11, 2011.

=== Penalties ===
The Act imposes or increases both fines and jail time penalties, and mandates coordination with the CPSC when effecting a manufacturer's product recall. The law:

- Increases civil penalties for failure to report possible product hazards to the CPSC in a timely manner from $5,000 per violation (with a cap of $1,825,000) to $100,000 per violation (with a cap of $15 million).
- Increases criminal penalties for various prohibited acts to include forfeiture of assets and imprisonment for up to five years, and eliminates the requirement that the CPSC first notify a company of noncompliance before seeking criminal penalties.
- Requires CPSC approval of the remedy offered in a product recall, rather than giving the recalling party its choice of repair, replace, or refund.

== Criticism ==
At the time of passage in 2008, manufacturers, both large and small, protested the extremely short timelines for implementation, the failure to take into account manufacturing processes, and the failure to take into account the breadth of the impact.

Congress passed this legislation in the wake of several high profile recalls in 2007 and 2008 of toys manufactured in China. Though many of these later turned out to be problems with design rather than manufacture, public pressure was increased as the result of at least one case of lead poisoning and subsequent issues with tainted pet food and other products shipped from China. The legislation, HR 4040, was passed in July 2008 and signed into law by President Bush in August 2008. The first deadline came up in September 2008, and several major deadlines came up in February 2009.

Manufacturers pointed out that many of the products to be impacted were already making their way through the supply chain. As a result, much inventory that was legal prior to the signing of the law and was manufactured shortly thereafter were probably already on shelves as the deadlines approached. The Natural Resources Defense Council and Public Citizen apparently agreed that these products were already in distribution, but believed that manufacturers should still be held liable. The problem was not the lead or phthalate content, as they imply, but the fact that the products must be tested to make sure they comply. There was also confusion of what products need a GCC and which do not. They had not been tested because the items generally do not contain hazardous materials; CPSC had been slow to define some of the accreditation or testing criteria; some of the low volume, low value items were not economical to test; and lot tracking methods would not allow some of the items to be tracked.

Manufacturers also point out that even if they attempted to comply, there are logistical problems. Companies with large varieties of products will have difficulty selecting several samples of every item. Even if they can, there are not enough testing facilities to handle the volume in time to meet the schedules.

Manufacturers also note both the difficulty and the apparently contradictory mandate to perform unit testing. An apparel manufacturer, for example, might use a single mill product such as organic cotton cloth coupled with a few organic dyes and a few pieces of hardware such as zippers or buttons. Those can be combined in limitless ways and in various sizes. Testing all of the final products generally provides no more information than would testing the individual inputs (or "components"), but is vastly more expensive. In response to this criticism, the CPSC added Rule 1109, known as the "Component Part Testing Rule", that allows U.S. importers to rely on suppliers to meet testing requirements, so long as “due care” is used to make sure that the supplier has in fact complied with requirements.

Final product testing may actually be counterproductive if, for example, a solid lead button is tested as part of a larger product. When tested separately, the button would fail, but when mixed together with the other inputs, the final total lead content may fall below the standard. Thus, unit testing would result in certifying the safety of a product which has unsafe components that could be swallowed by a child.

Other manufacturers point out the problem of defining "children's products." Electronic products such as video games could be considered children's products, and are therefore subject to that testing. Electronics products contain lead as a component of solder; whereas the European Restriction of Hazardous Substances Directive standards have long attempted to phase out lead solder, the tin solder is known to suffer from a defect known as tin whiskers. This means that entire classes of products may become unavailable as manufacturers withdraw from the markets, banned as they are unable to pass tests, or defective as they substitute inferior components.

Additionally, products such as “regular Children’s books”, that have never been a health problem, are being included in the products that must be tested and certified.

The law requires some rulings from the CPSC on a predetermined schedule, and allows for other rulings as necessary. Manufacturers must wait until a final ruling is made before they can perform the required testing or gather the required documentation. Many times this ruling isn't available until after the item is already required. For example, the law required the issuance of a GCC for products manufactured "on and after November 12, 2008", but the GCC ruling was not published in the Federal Register until November 18, 2008.

These criticisms have been leveled by large and small manufacturers alike. According to 2002 business census data, 99% of the apparel manufacturers in the United States are small businesses, using the Small Business Administration's definition of "less than 500 employees." Many of them believe that they will not be able to manage or afford the mandated testing and will go out of business. This has resulted in an online petition campaign by small manufacturers of children's apparel.

Larger manufacturers are faced with problems stemming from their leverage, from aspects of Sarbanes-Oxley legislation, from their visibility, and from the logistics of managing the testing of large varieties of products. Large manufacturers tend to be very leveraged, and use their eligible inventory as their borrowing base. Because the inventory is going to become unsalable on February 10, 2009, there will be an abrupt change in their borrowing base. This raises the question of whether corporate officers can legitimately claim inventory in their current borrowing base. Because many of these loan agreements and all publicly traded companies require audited financial statements at the end of the year, inventories will be tested. This will result in a negative change in valuation and a sharp reduction or termination of available credit. For public companies, it raises the issue of whether those officers are making false representations, introducing the specter of criminal liability under Sarbanes-Oxley.

In early 2009, local media reported that children's clothes, books, toys, and other items were being removed from shelves at local stores - and in some of these cases even to the point of causing the entire store to close - in Wichita, Kansas, Ionia, Michigan, Conway, Arkansas, Goldsboro, North Carolina, Lincoln, Nebraska, New York City, New York (NYC), Rochester, New York, Marshall, Minnesota, Kailua, Hawaii, New Port Richey, Florida, and Tucson, Arizona.

According to Walter Olson's report 'The New Book Banning' in 'City Journal' (NYC), the CPSIA has problems because due to economics, some stores destroyed books, and some used book sellers removed many books. One small bookstore owner interviewee criticized the CPSC and referenced the book Fahrenheit 451, where the destruction of books at government behest was a plot point. Olson also claims that there has never been any known case of a child receiving lead poisoning from a book. In his closing paragraph, Olson writes "... ours will be a poorer world...".

The enactment of the CPSIA banned the sale of youth motorcycles and ATVs because of the lead content of battery terminals and tire valve stems. The law has a provision for exceptions to be made by the CPSC, but it has not done so for these products as of March 2009. The ban has left many motorsports retailers with unsalable products, and motorcycle industry leaders suggest that the ban may cost the US economy $1 billion. However, on 08/12/11, an amendment was signed by President Obama, which exempts youth ATVs and motorcycles from the CPSIA.

== See also ==
- U.S. Consumer Product Safety Commission
- 2007 pet food recalls
- 2007 Chinese export recalls
