= Diallyl phthalate =

Names
- IUPAC name bis(prop-2-enyl) benzene-1,2-dicarboxylate

Identifiers
CAS Number	131-17-9
3D model (JSmol)	Interactive image
Abbreviations	DAP
ChEMBL	ChEMBL1329372
ChemSpider	8242
ECHA InfoCard	100.004.562
EC Number	205-016-3
PubChem CID	8560
UNII	F79L0UL6ST
UN number	3082
CompTox Dashboard (EPA)	DTXSID7020392
- InChI: Key: QUDWYFHPNIMBFC-UHFFFAOYSA-N; InChI=1S/C14H14O4/c1-3-9-17-13(15)11-7-5-6-8-12(11)14(16)18-10-4-2/h3-8H,1-2,9-10H2
- SMILES: C=CCOC(=O)C1=CC=CC=C1C(=O)OCC=C

Properties
Chemical formula	C_{6}H_{4}(CO_{2}CH_{2}CHCH_{2})_{2}
Molar mass	246.26 g/mol
Appearance	colorless oil
Odor	odorless
Density	1.121 g/mL
Melting point	−70 °C (−94 °F; 203 K)
Boiling point	157 °C (315 °F; 430 K)
Solubility in water	0.015 g/100mL
log P	3.23
Vapor pressure	2.4 millimetres of mercury (320 Pa) (150 °C (302 °F; 423 K); 0.02 pascals (0.00015 mmHg) (25 °C (77 °F; 298 K))

Hazards
- GHS labelling
Pictograms	(GHS07: Exclamation mark) (GHS09: Environmental hazard)
Signal word	Warning
Hazard statements	H302, H410
NFPA 704 (fire diamond)	1 1 1
Autoignition temperature	385 °C (725 °F; 658 K)

Related compounds
Related compounds	diethyl phthalate; dimethyl phthalate; diethylhexyl phthalate; dibutyl phthalate; dioctyl phthalate
- Except where otherwise noted, data are given for materials in their standard state (at 25 °C [77 °F], 100 kPa). Infobox references

Diallyl phthalate (DAP) is an organic compound with the formula C_{6}H_{4}(CO_{2}CH_{2}CHCH_{2})_{2}. Like most other phthalate esters, it is a colorless oil although commercial samples can appear yellowish. It is synthesized by treating phthalic anhydride with allyl alcohol.

== Applications ==
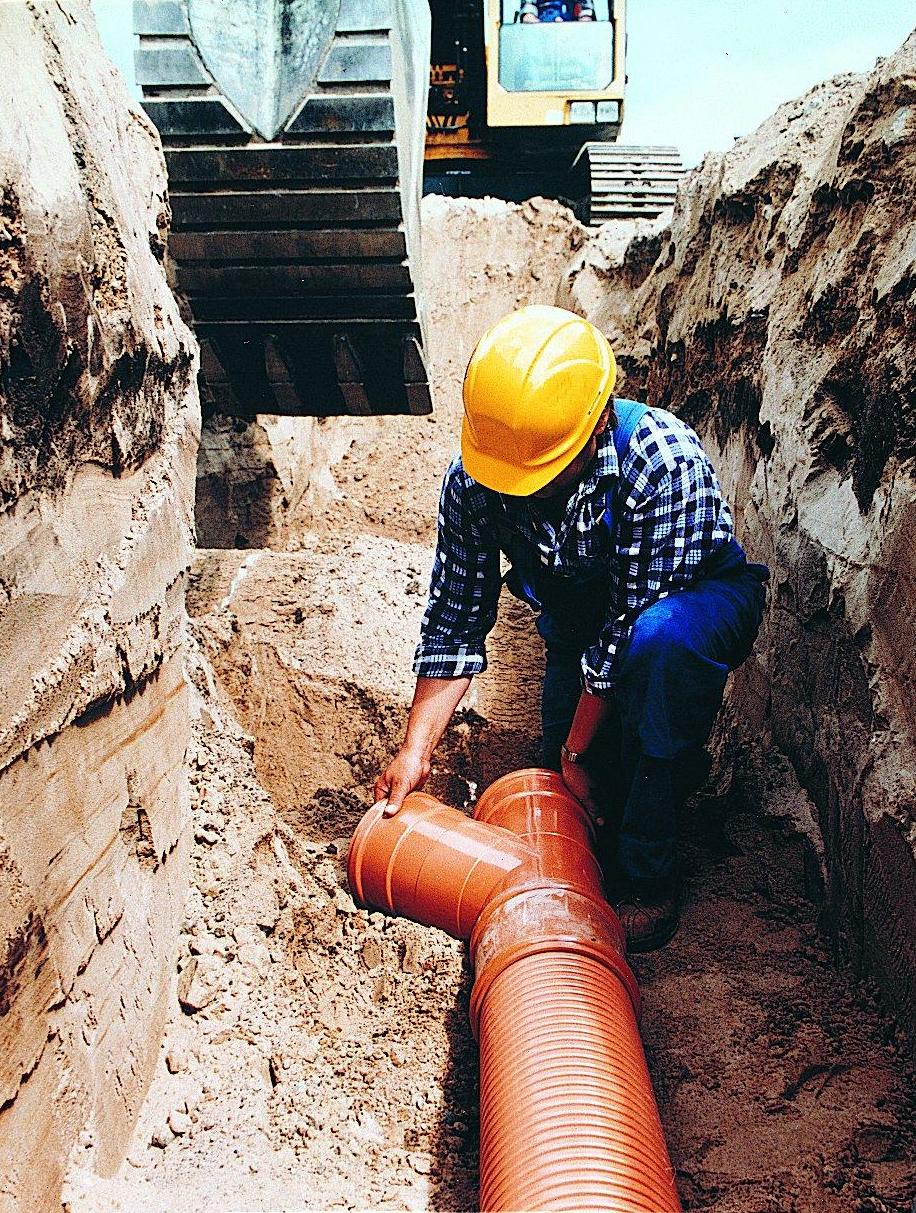
Phthalate plasticizers are essential for the utility of PVC, which is too brittle otherwise.

Diallyl phthalate is a widely used as a plasticizer in the production of polyvinyl chloride (PVC). It enhances tensile strength and elongation at break (the ratio of the final and initial lengths of material before breaking), and also acts as a chain extender due to the allyl groups that can form cross-links between PVC chains.

DAP is a plasticizer used to produce thermosetting resins, laminates, and varnishes as well as impregnation of metal castings in aerospace and military electrical components. This is due to its reliability in extreme conditions, with properties such as electrical and thermal insulation, ability to withstand high humidity, water resistance, chemical resistance, and molding. It resists dimensional change in high-heat environments, such as soldering. It is used in organic solvent-free UV printing inks due to its quick-drying ability, as well as construction materials.

== Environmental aspects ==
DAP has been widely studied, especially in as a potential endocrine disruptor.
