= Methyl ethyl ketone peroxide =

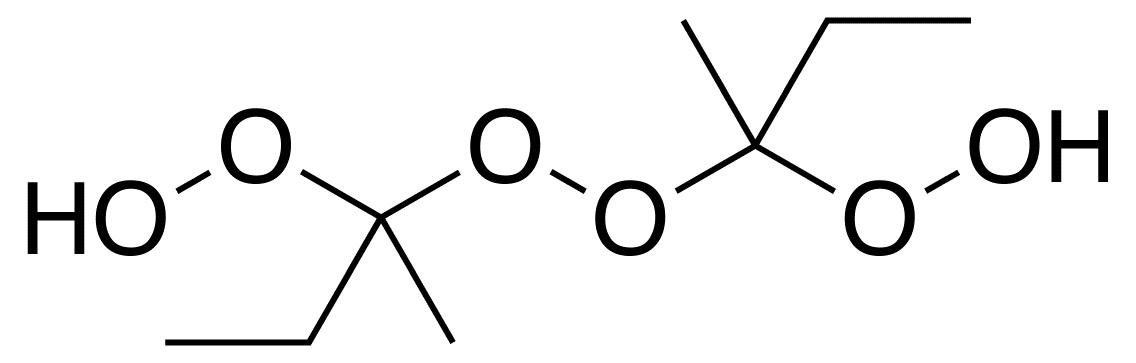

Names
- Preferred IUPAC name 2,2′-Peroxydi(butane-2-peroxol)
- Other names 2-[(2-Hydroperoxybutan-2-yl)peroxy]butane-2-peroxol; 2-Hydroperoxy-2-[(2-hydroperoxybutan-2-yl)peroxy]butane; Ketonox; Mepox; Thermacure

Identifiers
CAS Number	1338-23-4
3D model (JSmol)	Interactive image
Beilstein Reference	1759757
ChemSpider	2905622
ECHA InfoCard	100.014.238
EC Number	215-661-2
MeSH	Methyl+ethyl+ketone+peroxide
PubChem CID	3672772
UNII	W2545087UL
UN number	3105
CompTox Dashboard (EPA)	DTXSID1024671
- InChI: InChI=1S/C8H18O6/c1-5-7(3,11-9)13-14-8(4,6-2)12-10/h9-10H,5-6H2,1-4H3 Key: WFUGQJXVXHBTEM-UHFFFAOYSA-N
- SMILES: CCC(C)(OO)OOC(C)(CC)OO

Properties
Chemical formula	C_{8}H_{18}O_{6}
Molar mass	210.226 g·mol^{−1}
Appearance	Colorless liquid
Density	1.170 g cm^{−3}
Boiling point	Decomposition beyond 80 °C (176 °F)
Solubility in water	Soluble

Explosive data
Shock sensitivity	High
Detonation velocity	5200 m/s
RE factor	0.9

Hazards
- Occupational safety and health (OHS/OSH)
Main hazards	Explosive, Toxic
- GHS labelling
Pictograms	(GHS01: Explosive) (GHS07: Exclamation mark) (GHS08: Health hazard)
Signal word	Danger
Hazard statements	H202, H205, H241, H300, H315, H318, H335
Precautionary statements	P102, P220, P243, P250, P261, P264, P280, P283, P370+P380, P372, P404
NFPA 704 (fire diamond)	2 2 4
Flash point	75 °C (167 °F; 348 K)
- NIOSH (US health exposure limits)
PEL (Permissible)	none
REL (Recommended)	C 0.2 ppm (1.5 mg/m^{3})
IDLH (Immediate danger)	N.D.
- Except where otherwise noted, data are given for materials in their standard state (at 25 °C [77 °F], 100 kPa). verify (what is ?) Infobox references

Methyl ethyl ketone peroxide (MEKP) is an organic peroxide with the formula [(CH_{3})(C_{2}H_{5})C(O_{2}H)]_{2}O_{2}. MEKP is a colorless oily liquid. It is widely used in vulcanization (crosslinking) of polymers.

It is derived from the reaction of methyl ethyl ketone and hydrogen peroxide under acidic conditions. Several products result from this reaction including a cyclic dimer. The linear dimer, the topic of this article, is the most prevalent and is the form that is typically quoted in the commercially available material.

Solutions of 30 to 40% MEKP are used in industry and by hobbyists as catalyst to initiate the crosslinking of unsaturated polyester resins used in fiberglass, and casting. For this application, MEKP often is dissolved in a phlegmatizer such as dimethyl phthalate, cyclohexane peroxide, or diallyl phthalate to reduce sensitivity to shock. Benzoyl peroxide can be used for the same purpose.

== Safety ==
Whereas acetone peroxide is a white powder at STP, MEKP is slightly less sensitive to shock and temperature, and more stable in storage.

MEKP is a severe skin irritant and can cause progressive corrosive damage or blindness.

The volatile decomposition products of MEKP can contribute to the formation of vapor-phase explosions. Ensuring safe storage is important, and the maximum storage temperature should be limited to below 30 °C.
