= DIBP =

DIBP may refer to:

- Department of Immigration and Border Protection of Australia
- Diisobutyl phthalate
