= C24H38O4 =

The molecular formula C_{24}H_{38}O_{4} (molar mass: 390.55 g/mol) may refer to:

- Bis(2-ethylhexyl) phthalate (dioctyl phthalate)
- Dioctyl terephthalate
