= Diethyl phthalate =

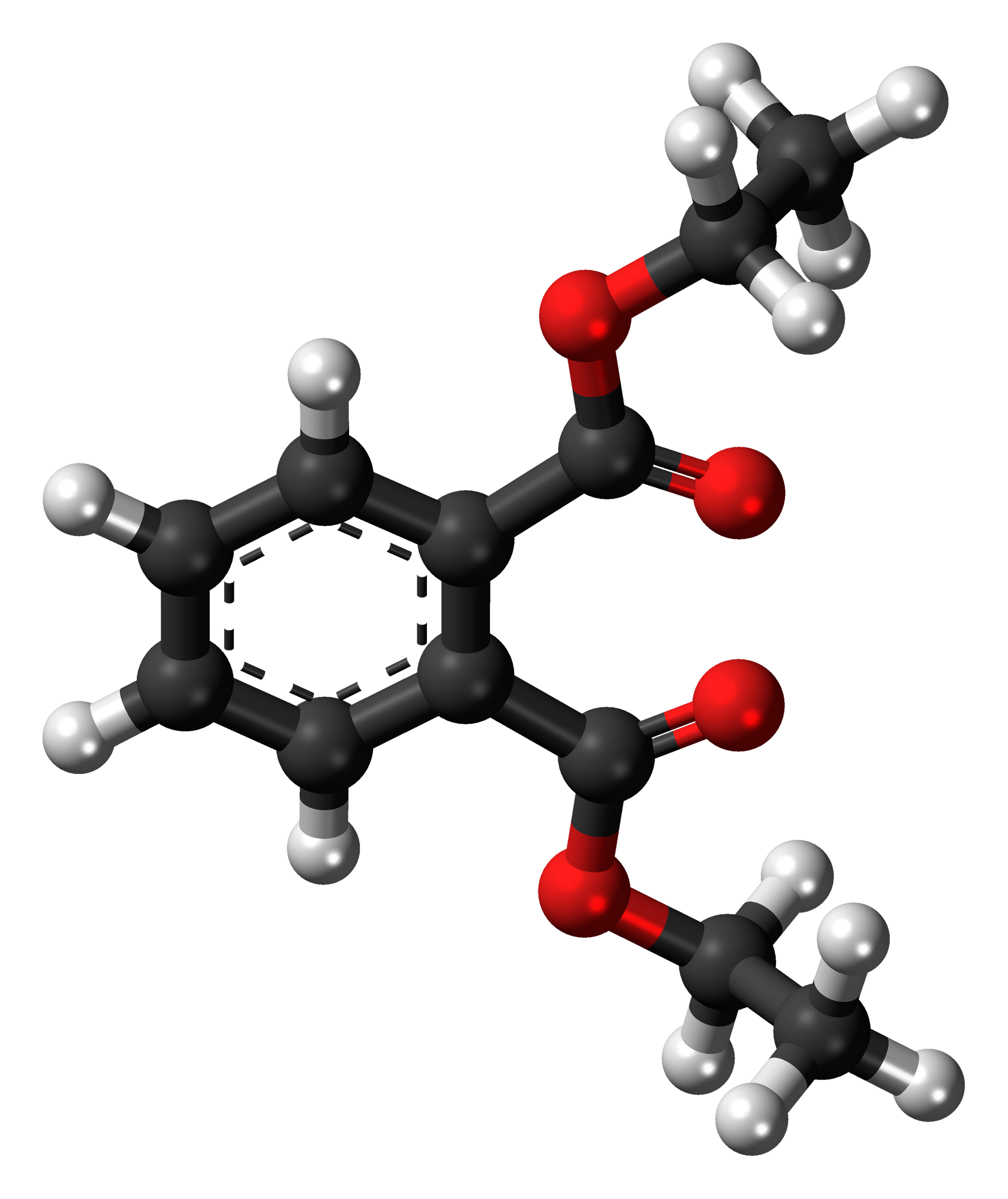

Names
- Preferred IUPAC name Diethyl benzene-1,2-dicarboxylate
- Other names Diethyl phthalate

Identifiers
CAS Number	84-66-2
3D model (JSmol)	Interactive image
ChEBI	CHEBI:34698
ChEMBL	ChEMBL388558
ChemSpider	13837303
ECHA InfoCard	100.001.409
KEGG	D03804
PubChem CID	6781
UNII	UF064M00AF
CompTox Dashboard (EPA)	DTXSID50892134, DTXSID201024388 DTXSID7021780, DTXSID50892134, DTXSID201024388
- InChI: InChI=1S/C12H14O4/c1-3-15-11(13)9-7-5-6-8-10(9)12(14)16-4-2/h5-8H,3-4H2,1-2H3 Key: FLKPEMZONWLCSK-UHFFFAOYSA-N; InChI=1/C12H14O4/c1-3-15-11(13)9-7-5-6-8-10(9)12(14)16-4-2/h5-8H,3-4H2,1-2H3 Key: FLKPEMZONWLCSK-UHFFFAOYAV
- SMILES: CCOC(=O)c1ccccc1C(=O)OCC

Properties
Chemical formula	C_{6}H_{4}(COOC_{2}H_{5})_{2}
Molar mass	222.240 g·mol^{−1}
Appearance	Colourless, oily liquid
Density	1.12 g/cm^{3} (20 °C (68 °F; 293 K))
Melting point	−3 °C (27 °F; 270 K)
Boiling point	298–299 °C (568–570 °F; 571–572 K)
Solubility in water	1.080 g/L
log P	2.42
Vapor pressure	0.27 pascals (0.002 mmHg) (25 °C (77 °F; 298 K); 190 pascals (1.4 mmHg) (163 °C (325 °F; 436 K))
Magnetic susceptibility (χ)	−127.5×10^{−6} cm^{3}/mol
Viscosity	9.500 Pa·s

Hazards
- GHS labelling
Hazard statements	H402
Precautionary statements	P273, P501
NFPA 704 (fire diamond)	0 1 0
Flash point	170 °C (338 °F; 443 K) 101.3 kPa
Autoignition temperature	457 °C (855 °F; 730 K)
Explosive limits	0.7%, lower (187 °C (369 °F; 460 K)
- Lethal dose or concentration (LD, LC)
LD_{50} (median dose)	5591 mg/kg (rat, oral); >11181 mg/kg (rat, dermal)
LC_{50} (median concentration)	≥4.64 mg/L (rat, vapor, 6h)
- NIOSH (US health exposure limits)
PEL (Permissible)	None
REL (Recommended)	5 mg/m^{3} (TWA)
IDLH (Immediate danger)	N.D.

Related compounds
Related compounds	dimethyl phthalate; diethylhexyl phthalate; dibutyl phthalate; dioctyl phthalate
- Except where otherwise noted, data are given for materials in their standard state (at 25 °C [77 °F], 100 kPa). verify (what is ?) Infobox references

Diethyl phthalate (DEP) is a phthalate ester with the formula C_{6}H_{4}(COOC_{2}H_{5})_{2} (or C_{12}H_{14}O_{4}). It is a colourless liquid without significant odour but with a bitter disagreeable taste.

== Synthesis ==
Diethyl phthalate is produced by the reaction of ethanol with phthalic anhydride, in the presence of a strong acid catalyst:

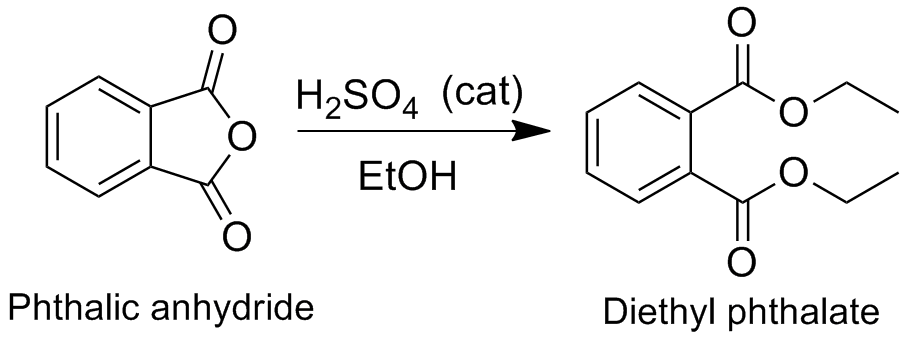

== Applications ==
It has been used as a plasticizer for cellulose acetate in many applications, the most common being scotch tape, film, eyewear frames, and biodegradable plastics; concentrations vary from 10% to 25% by weight. It is compatible as a plasticizer with most cellulose derivatives including nitrocellulose, as well as polystyrene (styrofoam), polymethyl methacrylate (Plexiglass), polyvinyl acetate (white glue), polyvinyl butyral, and polyvinyl chloride (PVC), though the less volatile and less migration-prone dibutyl phthalate or a heavier phthalate was often preferred for long-chain or higher molecular weight polymers.

It has been used in double-base propellants with high percentages of nitroglycerin. In these compositions, nitroglycerin acts as the plasticizer. The specific function of diethyl phthalate is not given. In ammonium perchlorate composite propellant, it has effects on viscosity similar to dibutyl phthalate and dioctyl adipate, but a higher density and lower fuel value than either.

It has also been used as a blender and fixative in perfume.

== Biodegradation ==
=== Biodegradation by microorganisms ===
Biodegradation of DEP in soil occurs by sequential hydrolysis of the two diethyl chains of the phthalate to produce monoethyl phthalate, followed by phthalic acid. This reaction occurs very slowly in an abiotic environment. Another pathway exists when methanol is also present. This biodegradation has been observed in several soil bacteria.

=== Biodegradation by mammals ===
Recent studies show that DEP, a phthalic acid ester (PAE), is enzymatically hydrolyzed to its monoesters by pancreatic cholesterol esterase (CEase) in pigs and cows. These mammalian pancreatic CEases have been found to be nonspecific for degradation in relation to the diversity of the alkyl side chains of PAEs.

== Toxicity ==
Little is known about the chronic toxicity of diethyl phthalate, but existing information suggests only a low toxic potential. Studies suggest that some phthalates affect male reproductive development via inhibition of androgen biosynthesis. In rats, for instance, repeated administration of diethyl phthalate results in loss of germ cell populations in the testis. However, diethyl phthalate does not alter sexual differentiation in male rats.

=== Cumulative ===
Some data suggest that exposure to multiple phthalates at low doses significantly increases the risk in a dose additive manner. Therefore, the risk from a mixture of phthalates or phthalates and other anti-androgens may not be accurately assessed studying one chemical at a time. The same may be said about risks from several exposure routes together. Humans are exposed to phthalates by multiple exposure routes (predominantly dermal), while toxicological testing is done via oral exposure.
