= Phthalates =

Any ester derived from phthalic acid

General chemical structure of orthophthalates. (R and R' are general placeholders.)

Phthalates (US: /ˈθæleɪts/ UK: /ˈ(f)θæleɪtsˌ ˈ(f)θælɪts/ THAL-ates), or phthalate esters, are esters of phthalic acid. They are colorless, odorless, oily compounds, although commercial samples can be yellowish with faint odors. Being fairly chemically inert and easily produced, they are widely used as plasticizers, i.e., substances added to polymers to increase their flexibility, transparency, durability, and longevity. They are used primarily to soften polyvinyl chloride (PVC). While phthalates are commonly used as plasticizers, not all plasticizers are phthalates. The two terms are specific, unique, and not used interchangeably.

The use of phthalate plasticizers has had a profound effect on the commercialization of PVC, promoting its use for major industrial and consumer applications where flexibility is required, such as for tubing, siding, packaging and wire sheathing.

Phthalates are controversial because, when ingested, they pose a threat as endocrine disruptors. Consequently their use is regulated, e.g. in the United States, Canada, and European Union.

== Production ==
Phthalate esters are produced industrially by the reaction of phthalic anhydride with excess alcohol. The monoesterification occurs readily, but the second step is slow:

C_{6}H_{4}(CO)_{2}O + ROH → C_{6}H_{4}(CO_{2}R)(CO_{2}H)
C_{6}H_{4}(CO_{2}R)(CO_{2}H) + ROH → C_{6}H_{4}(CO_{2}R)_{2} + H_{2}O

The conversion is conducted at high temperatures to drive off the water. Typical catalysts are tin or titanium alkoxides or carboxylates.

The properties of the phthalate are affected somewhat by the alcohol. Around 30 are, or have been, commercially important. Phthalates' share of the global plasticisers market has been decreasing since around 2000, but total production has been increasing, with around 5.5 million tonnes made in 2015, up from around 2.7 million tonnes in the 1980s. This increase is due to the increasing size of the plasticiser market, largely due to increases in PVC production, which nearly doubled between 2000 and 2020. The People's Republic of China is the largest consumer of phthalates, accounting for around 45% of all use. Europe and the United States together account for around 25% of use, with the remainder widely spread around the world.

Common phthalates Ordered by molecular weight, commercially important compounds shown in bold
Name	Abbreviation	Alcohol carbon number	Molecular weight (g/mol)	CAS No.	Properties of concern for human health (ECHA classification 2022)
Dimethyl phthalate	DMP	1	194.18	131-11-3	
Diethyl phthalate	DEP	2	222.24	84-66-2	Under assessment as endocrine disrupting
Diallyl phthalate	DAP	3	246.26	131-17-9	Skin sensitising
Di-n-propyl phthalate	DPP	3	250.29	131-16-8	
**Di-n-butyl phthalate**	**DBP**	4	278.34	84-74-2	Toxic to reproduction, endocrine disrupting.
Diisobutyl phthalate	DIBP	4	278.34	84-69-5	Toxic to reproduction, endocrine disrupting
Di-2-methoxyethyl phthalate	DMEP	3	282.29	117-82-8	Toxic to reproduction
Butyl cyclohexyl phthalate	BCP	4 – 6	304.38	84-64-0	
Di-n-pentyl phthalate	DNPP	5	306.4	131-18-0	Toxic to reproduction
Dicyclohexyl phthalate	DCP	6	330.42	84-61-7	Toxic to reproduction, endocrine disrupting, skin sensitising
**Butyl benzyl phthalate**	**BBP**	4 – 7	312.36	85-68-7	Toxic to reproduction, endocrine disrupting
Di-n-hexyl phthalate	DNHP	6	334.45	84-75-3	Toxic to reproduction
Diisohexyl phthalate	DIHxP	6	334.45	146-50-9	Toxic to reproduction
Diisoheptyl phthalate	DIHpP	7	362.5	41451-28-9	Toxic to reproduction
Butyl decyl phthalate	BDP	4 – 10	362.5	89-19-0	
Dibutoxy ethyl phthalate	DBEP	6	366.45	117-83-9	
**Di(2-ethylhexyl) phthalate**	**DEHP, DOP**	8	390.56	117-81-7	Toxic to reproduction, endocrine disrupting
Di(n-octyl) phthalate	DNOP	8	390.56	117-84-0	Not classified but some uses restricted
Diisooctyl phthalate	DIOP	8	390.56	27554-26-3	Toxic to reproduction
n-Octyl n-decyl phthalate	ODP	8 – 10	418.61	119-07-3	
**Diisononyl phthalate**	**DINP**	9	418.61	28553-12-0	Not classified but some uses restricted
**Di(2-propylheptyl) phthalate**	**DPHP**	10	446.66	53306-54-0	Under assessment as endocrine disrupting
**Diisodecyl phthalate**	**DIDP**	10	446.66	26761-40-0	
Diundecyl phthalate	DUP	11	474.72	3648-20-2	
Diisoundecyl phthalate	DIUP	11	474.72	85507-79-5	
Ditridecyl phthalate	DTDP	13	530.82	119-06-2	
Diisotridecyl phthalate	DITP	13	530.82	68515-47-9	

== Uses ==
=== PVC plasticisers ===
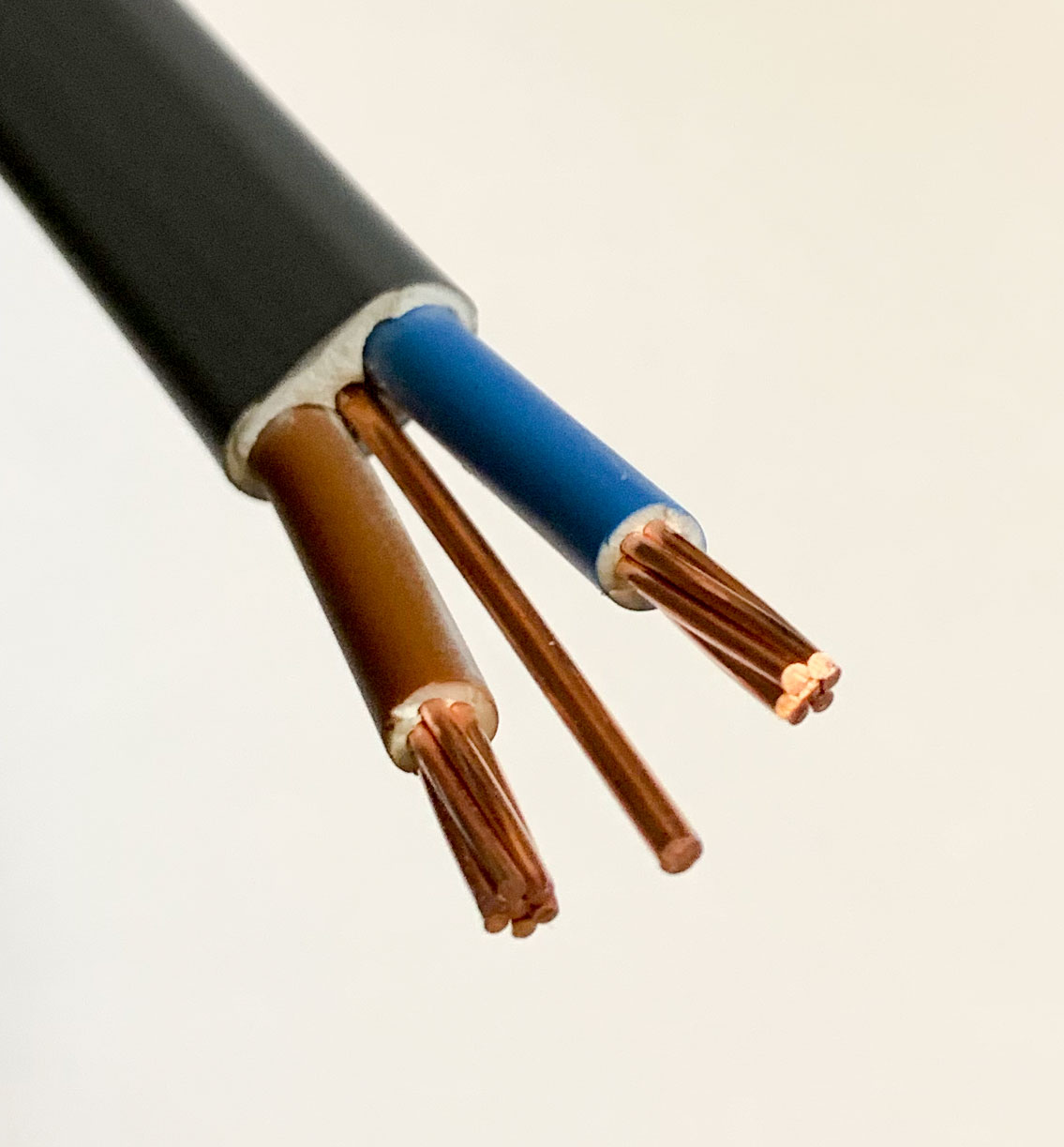
Plasticised PVC has excellent electrical insulation properties and is extensively used as sheathing for wires and cables.

Between 90 and 95% of all phthalates are used as plasticisers for the production of flexible PVC. The majority is used in films and cable sheathing. Flexible PVC can consist of over 85% plasticizer by mass, however unplasticized PVC (UPVC) should not contain any. Pthalates were the first commercially important compounds for this role, a historic advantage that has led to them becoming firmly embedded in flexible PVC technology. Among the common plastics, PVC is unique in its acceptance of large amounts of plasticizer with gradual changes in physical properties from a rigid solid to a soft gel. Phthalates derived from alcohols with 7–13 carbon atoms occupy a privileged position as general purpose plasticizers, suitable for almost all flexible PVC applications. Phthalates larger than this have limited compatibility in PVC, with di(isotridecyl) phthalate representing the practical upper limit. Conversely, plasticizers derived from alcohols with 4–6 carbon atoms are too volatile to be used on their own, but have been used alongside other compounds as secondary plasticizers, where they improve low-temperature flexibility. Compounds derived from alcohols with 1–3 carbon atoms are not used as plasticizers in PVC at all, due to excessive fuming at processing temperatures (typically 180–210 °C).

Historically DINP, DEHP, BBP, DBP, and DIHP have been the most important phthalates, however many of these are now facing regulatory pressure and gradual phase-outs. Almost all phthalates derived from alcohols with between 3 and 8 carbons are classed as toxic by ECHA. This includes bis(2-ethylhexyl) phthalate (DEHP or DOP), which has long been the most widely used phthalate, with commercial production beginning in the 1930s. In the EU, the use of DEHP is restricted under REACH and it can only be used in specific cases if an authorisation has been granted; similar restrictions exist in many other jurisdictions. Despite this, the phase-out of DEHP is slow and it was still the most frequently used plasticizer in 2018, with an estimated global production of 3.24 million tonnes. DINP and DIDP are used as a substitutes for DEHP in many applications, as they are not classified as hazardous. Non-phthalate plasticizers are also being increasingly used.

PVC properties as a function of phthalate plasticizer level
	Plasticizer content (% DINP by weight)	Specific gravity (20 °C)	Shore hardness (type A, 15 s)	Flexural stiffness (Mpa)	Tensile strength (Mpa)	Elongation at break (%)	Example applications
Rigid	0	1.4		900	41	<15	Unplasticized PVC (UPVC): window frames and sills, doors, rigid pipe
Semi-rigid	25	1.26	94	69	31	225	Vinyl flooring, flexible pipe, thin films (stretch wrap), advertising banners
Flexible	33	1.22	84	12	21	295	Wire and cable insulation, flexible pipe
Very flexible	44	1.17	66	3.4	14	400	Boots and clothing, inflatables,
Extremely flexible	86	1.02	< 10				Fishing lures (soft plastic bait), polymer clay, plastisol inks

=== Non-PVC plasticisers ===
Phthalates see use as plasticisers in various other polymers, with applications centred around coatings such as lacquers, varnishes, and paints. The addition of phthalates imparts some flexibility to these materials, reducing their tendency to chip. Phthalates derived from alcohols with between 1–4 carbon atoms are used as plasticisers for cellulose-type plastics, such as cellulose acetate, nitrocellulose and cellulose acetate butyrate, with commonly encountered applications including nail polish. Most phthalates are also compatible with alkyds and acrylic resins, which are used in both oil and emulsion based paints.

Other plasticised polymer systems include polyvinyl butyral (particularly the forms used to make laminated glass), PVA and its co-polymers like PVCA. They are also compatible in nylon, polystyrene, polyurethanes, and certain rubbers; but their use in these is very limited.

Phthalates can plasticise ethyl cellulose, polyvinyl acetate phthalate (PVAP) and cellulose acetate phthalate (CAP), all of which are used to make enteric coatings for tablet and capsule medications. These coatings protect drugs from the acidity of the stomach, but allow their release and absorption in the intestines.

=== Solvent and phlegmatizer ===
Phthalate esters are widely used as solvents for highly reactive organic peroxides. Thousands of tonnes are consumed annually for this purpose. The great advantage offered by these esters is that they are phlegmatizers, i.e. they minimize the explosive tendencies of a family of chemical compounds that otherwise are potentially dangerous to handle. Phthalates have also been used for producing plastic explosives such as Semtex.

=== Other uses ===
Relatively minor amounts of some phthalates find use in personal-care items such as eye shadow, moisturizer, nail polish, liquid soap, and hair spray. Low-molecular-weight phthalates like dimethyl phthalate and diethyl phthalate are used as fixatives for perfumes. Dimethyl phthalate has been also used as an insect repellent and is especially useful against ixodid ticks responsible for Lyme disease. and species of mosquitoes such as Anopheles stephensi, Culex pipiens and Aedes aegypti,

Diallyl phthalate is used to prepare vinyl ester resins with good electrical insulation properties. These resins are used to manufacture of electronics components.

== Properties ==
Phthalates are colorless, odorless liquids produced by the reaction of phthalic anhydride with alcohols. From the chemical perspective, they are both lipophilic and somewhat polar. This combination allows them to serve as a plasticizer (softener) for PVC, when the two are blended together. Because they are not chemically bonded to the host plastics, phthalates are released from the article by relatively gentle means. For example, they can be extracted by contact with skin.

=== Alternatives ===
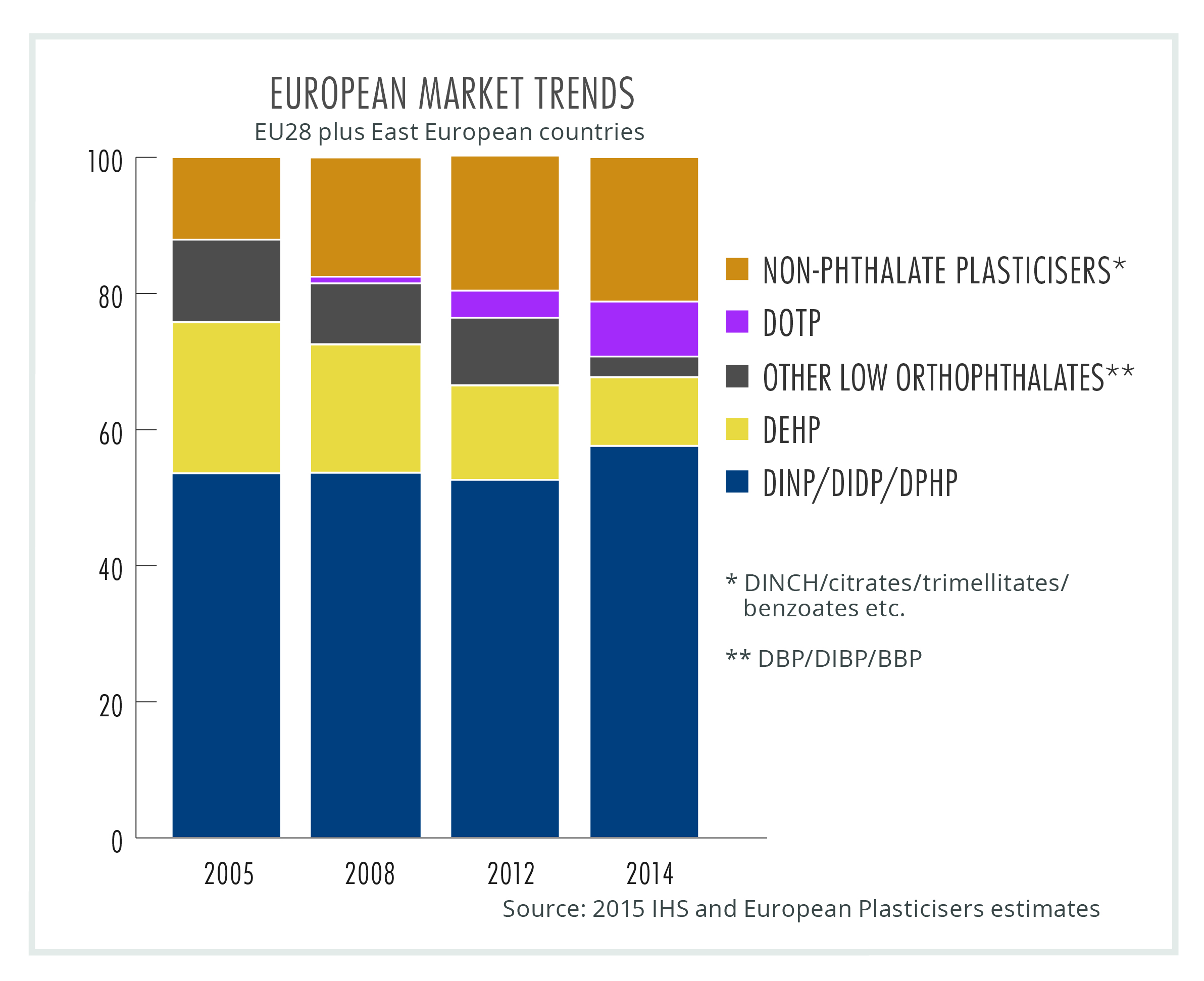
Market trend in decreasing use of low orthophthalates including DEHP

Being inexpensive, nontoxic (in an acute sense), colorless, noncorrosive, biodegradable, and with easily tuned physical properties, phthalate esters are nearly ideal plasticizers. Among the numerous alternative plasticizers are dioctyl terephthalate (DEHT) (a terephthalate isomeric with DEHP) and 1,2-cyclohexane dicarboxylic acid diisononyl ester (DINCH) (a hydrogenated version of DINP). Both DEHT and DINCH have been used in high volumes for a variety of products used in contact with humans as alternative plasticizers for DEHP and DINP. Some of these products include medical devices, toys, and food packaging. DEHT and DINCH are more hydrophobic than other phthalate alternatives such as bis(2-ethylhexyl) adipate (DEHA) and diisodecyl adipate (DIDA). Since alternative plasticizers such as DEHT and DINCH are more likely to bind to organic matter and airborne particles indoors, exposure occurs primarily through food consumption and contact with dust.

Many bio-based plasticizers based on vegetable oil have been developed.

== Occurrence and exposure ==
=== Human exposure ===
Due to the ubiquity of plasticized plastics, people are often exposed to phthalates. For example, most Americans tested by the Centers for Disease Control and Prevention have metabolites of multiple phthalates in their urine. Exposure to phthalates is more likely in women and people of color. Differences were found between Mexican-Americans, African-Americans, and Caucasian-Americans in terms of the overall risk of disturbance of glucose homeostasis. With Mexican-Americans having a fasting blood glucose (FBG) increase of 5.82 mg/dL, African-Americans having a fasting blood glucose increase of 3.63 mg/dL, and Caucasian-Americans having a fasting blood glucose increase of 1.79 mg/dL, there was evidence of an increased risk for minorities. Overall, the study concludes that phthalates may alter glucose homeostasis and insulin sensitivity. Higher levels of some phthalate metabolites were associated with elevated FBG, fasting insulin, and insulin resistance. Non-Hispanic black women and Hispanic women have higher levels of some phthalate metabolites.

Higher dust concentrations of DEHP were found in homes of children with asthma and allergies, compared with healthy children's homes. The author of the study stated, "The concentration of DEHP was found to be significantly associated with wheezing in the last 12 months as reported by the parents." Phthalates were found in almost every sampled home in Bulgaria. The same study found that DEHP, BBzP, and DnOP were in significantly higher concentrations in dust samples collected in homes where polishing agents were used. Data on flooring materials was collected, but there was not a significant difference in concentrations between homes where no polish was used that have balatum (PVC or linoleum) flooring and homes with wood. High frequency of dusting did decrease the concentration.

In general, children's exposure to phthalates is greater than that of adults. In a 1990s Canadian study that modeled ambient exposures, it was estimated that daily exposure to DEHP was 9 μg/kg bodyweight/day in infants, 19 μg/kg bodyweight/day in toddlers, 14 μg/kg bodyweight/day in children, and 6 μg/kg bodyweight/day in adults. Infants and toddlers are at the greatest risk of exposure, because of their mouthing behavior. Body-care products containing phthalates are a source of exposure for infants. The authors of a 2008 study "observed that reported use of infant lotion, infant powder, and infant shampoo were associated with increased infant urine concentrations of [phthalate metabolites], and this association is strongest in younger infants. These findings suggest that dermal exposures may contribute significantly to phthalate body burden in this population." Although they did not examine health outcomes, they noted that "Young infants are more vulnerable to the potential adverse effects of phthalates given their increased dosage per unit body surface area, metabolic capabilities, and developing endocrine and reproductive systems."

Infants and hospitalized children are particularly susceptible to phthalate exposure. Medical devices and tubing may contain 20–40% di(2-ethylhexyl) phthalate (DEHP) by weight, which "easily leach out of tubing when heated (as with warm saline / blood)". Several medical devices contain phthalates including, but not limited to, IV tubing, gloves, nasogastric tubes, and respiratory tubing. The Food and Drug Administration did an extensive risk assessment of phthalates in the medical setting and found that neonates may be exposed to five times greater than the allowed daily tolerable intake. This finding led to the conclusion by the FDA that, "children undergoing certain medical procedures may represent a population at increased risk for the effects of DEHP".

In 2008, the Danish Environmental Protection Agency (EPA) found a variety of phthalates in erasers and warned of health risks when children regularly suck and chew on them. The European Commission Scientific Committee on Health and Environmental Risks (SCHER), however, considers that, even in the case when children bite off pieces from erasers and swallow them, it is unlikely that this exposure leads to health consequences.

In 2008, the United States National Research Council recommended that the cumulative effects of phthalates and other antiandrogens be investigated. It criticized U.S. EPA guidances which stipulate that when examining cumulative effects, the chemicals examined should have similar mechanisms of action or similar structures, qualifying them as too restrictive. It recommended instead that the effects of chemicals that cause similar adverse outcomes should be examined cumulatively. Thus, the effect of phthalates should be examined together with other antiandrogens, which otherwise may have been excluded because their mechanisms or structure are different.

==== Food ====
Phthalates are found in food, especially fast food items. Phthalate DnBP was detected in 81 percent of the samples, while DEHP was found in 70 percent. Diethylhexyl terephthalate (DEHT), the main alternative to DEHP, was detected in 86%. A 2024 study by Consumer Reports found phthalates in all but one of the grocery store products and fast foods they tested.

Diet is believed to be the main source of DEHP and other phthalates in the general population. Fatty foods such as milk, butter, and meats are a major source. Studies show that exposure to phthalates is greater from ingestion of certain foods, rather than exposure via water bottles, as is most often first thought of with plastic chemicals. Low-molecular-weight phthalates such as DEP, DBP, BBzP may be dermally absorbed. Inhalational exposure is also significant with the more volatile phthalates. PVC tubing, vinyl gloves used in food handling, and food packaging may serve as potential sources of phthalate contamination in fast food.

One study, conducted between 2003 and 2010 analysing data from 9,000 individuals, found that those who reported that they had eaten at a fast food restaurant had much higher levels of two separate phthalates—DEHP and DiNP—in their urine samples. Even small consumption of fast food caused higher presence of phthalates. "People who reported eating only a little fast food had DEHP levels that were 15.5 percent higher and DiNP levels that were 25 percent higher than those who said they had eaten none. For people who reported eating a sizable amount, the increase was 24 percent and 39 percent, respectively." Phthalates have a short half-life of less than five hours, so their widespread presence likely indicates continuous exposure rather than long-term accumulation in the body.

==== Air ====
Outdoor air concentrations are higher in urban and suburban areas than in rural and remote areas. They also pose no acute toxicity.

Common plasticizers such as DEHP are only weakly volatile. Higher air temperatures result in higher concentrations of phthalates in the air. PVC flooring leads to higher concentrations of BBP and DEHP, which are more prevalent in dust. A 2012 Swedish study of children found that phthalates from PVC flooring were taken up into their bodies, showing that children can ingest phthalates not only from food but also by breathing and through the skin.

=== Natural occurrence ===
Various plants and microorganisms produce small amounts of phthalate esters, the so-called endogenous phthalates. Biosynthesis is believed to involve a modified Shikimate pathway The extent of this natural production is not fully known, but it may create a background of phthalate pollution.

=== Biodegradation ===
Phthalates do not persist in the environment due to rapid biodegradation, as established by many studies. Aerobic and anaerobic bacteria promote oxidation of the ring to give phenolic derivatives which further degrade. Even in the absence of bacteria but especially in the presence of soil, phthalate esters undergo hydrolysis to phthalate as well as other processes that affect the ester bond.

Photodegradation is another avenue for degradation.

== Research ==
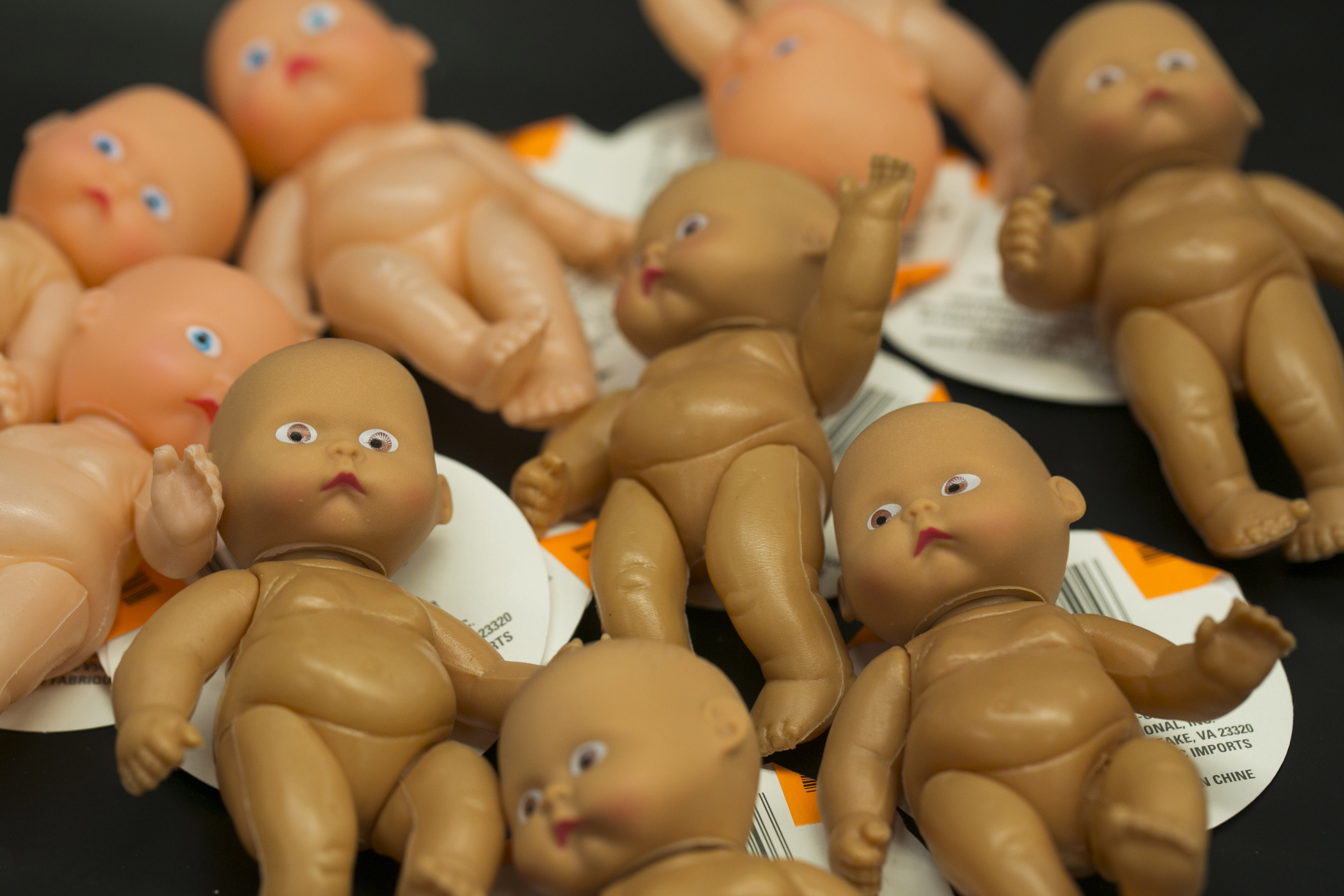
Toy dolls manufactured in China and seized by U.S. Customs and Border Protection in 2013 due to high phthalate levels

Phthalates are under research as a class of possible endocrine disruptors, substances that may interfere with normal hormonal responses in varied environmental conditions. The concern has sparked demands to ban or restrict the use of phthalates in baby toys.

A 2024 review indicated that exposure of mothers to environmental phthalates may have adverse pregnancy outcomes, such as a higher miscarriage rate and lower birth weights. Another review showed small reductions in lung function in adolescents and children who had been exposed to phthalates.

A 2017 review indicated ways to avoid exposure to phthalates: (1) eating a balanced diet to avoid ingesting too many endocrine disruptors from a single source, (2) eliminating canned or packaged food in order to limit ingestion of DEHP phthalates leached from plastics, and (3) eliminating use of any personal product such as moisturizer, perfume, or cosmetics that contain phthalates. Exposure to phthalates may increase the risk of asthma.

A 2018 study indicated that exposure to phthalates during developmental stages in childhood may negatively affect adipose tissue function and metabolic homeostasis, possibly increasing the risk of obesity.

== Safety ==
Phthalates are commonly ingested in small quantities via the diet. One of the most commonly known phthalates is bis(2-ethylhexyl) phthalate (DEHP). Canada, Australia and the EU have regulated DEHP as a toxin, and banned its from use in broad categories of consumer goods, such as cosmetics, children's toys, medical devices, and food packaging (to varying degrees country by country)

== Legal status ==
The governments of Australia, New Zealand, Canada, the US, and California have determined that many phthalates are not harmful to human health or the environment in amounts typically found, and therefore are legally unregulated. The focus for regulation in these jurisdictions has been mainly on diethyl phthalate (DEHP), which is generally regarded as a carcinogenic toxin requiring regulation.

The European Chemicals Agency (European Union, EU) regards ortho-phthalates, such as DEHP, dibutyl phthalate, diisobutyl phthalate, and benzyl butyl phthalate as potentially harmful to fertility, unborn babies, and the endocrine system. The EU also regulates some phthalates to protect the environment.

=== Australia and New Zealand ===
A 2017 survey of foods and packaging in Australia and New Zealand led to recognition of DEHP and diisononyl phthalate as among possible contaminants posing a risk to human health, resulting in several regulations on these phthalates in both countries. Australia has a permanent ban on certain children's products containing DEHP, which is considered poisonous if products containing it are placed in the mouths of children up to three years old.

=== Canada ===
In 1994, a Health Canada assessment found that DEHP and another phthalate product, B79P, were harmful to human health. The Canadian federal government responded by banning their use in cosmetics and restricting their use in other applications, such as soft toys and child-care products. In 1999, DEHP was put on the national List of Toxic Substances, under the Canadian Environmental Protection Act, 1999, and in 2021, it was deemed a risk to the environment. It is on the List of Ingredients that are Prohibited for Use in Cosmetic Products.

Twenty of the 28 phthalate substances under national screening programs are considered possible risks to human health or the environment. As of 2021, regulations to protect the environment against DEHP and B79P have not been enacted.

=== European Union ===
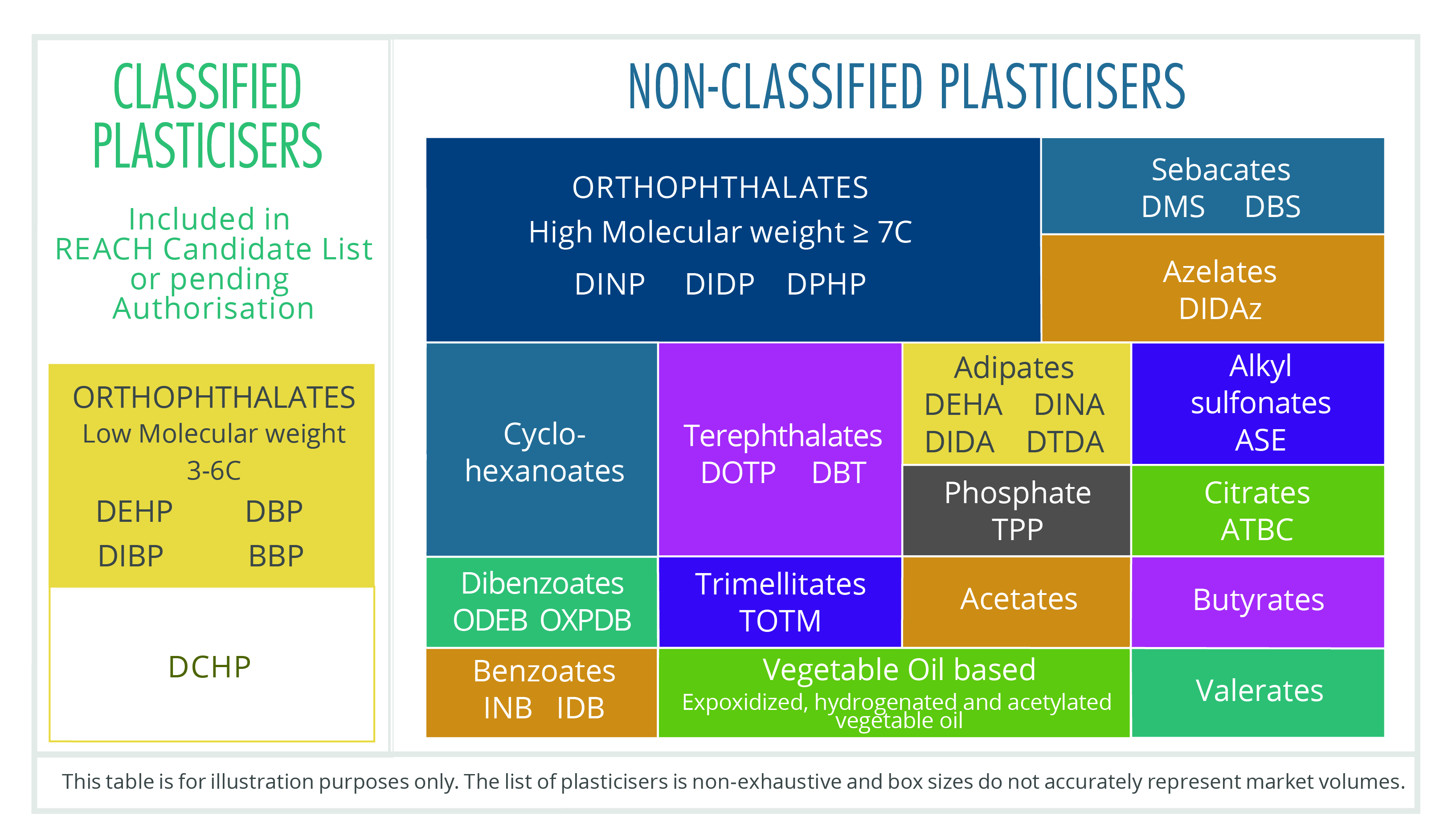
Update on non-classified plasticisers and the European REACH Candidate Classification including pending authorisation

Some phthalates have been restricted in the European Union for use in children's toys since 1999. DEHP, BBP, and DBP are restricted for all toys; DINP, DIDP, and DNOP are restricted only in toys that can be taken into the mouth. The restriction states that the amount of these phthalates may not be greater than 0.1% mass percent of the plasticized part of the toy.

Generally, the high molecular weight phthalates DINP, DIDP, and DPHP have been registered under REACH and have demonstrated their safety for use in current applications. They are not classified for any health or environmental effects.

The low molecular weight products BBP, DEHP, DIBP, and DBP were added to the Candidate list of Substances for Authorisation under REACH in 2008–09, and added to the Authorisation list, Annex XIV, in 2012. This means that from February 2015 they are not allowed to be produced in the EU unless authorisation has been granted for a specific use, although they may still be imported in consumer products. The creation of an Annex XV dossier, which could ban the import of products containing these chemicals, was being prepared jointly by the ECHA and Danish authorities, and expected to be submitted by April 2016.

Since 2021, the European Waste Framework Directive requires manufacturers, importers and distributors of products containing phthalates on the REACH Candidate List to notify the European Chemicals Agency.

In November 2021, the European Commission added endocrine disrupting properties to DEHP and other phthalates, meaning that companies must apply for REACH authorization for some uses that were previously exempted, including in food packaging, medical devices, and drug packaging.

==== Legislation, additional ====
Date	Action	References
December 14, 2005	The European Union restricted phthalates from several children's toys.	
June 8, 2011	Guarantees the sale of electronic products free of phthalates.	
July 4, 2017	Included in the candidate list referred to as substances toxic for reproduction.	
November 23, 2021	DIBP is declared as an endocrine disrupting chemical.	
August 11, 2021	The European Parliament eliminates DIBP and other phthalates from sanitary products.	

=== United States ===
During August 2008, the United States Congress passed and President George W. Bush signed the Consumer Product Safety Improvement Act (CPSIA), which became public law 110–314. Section 108 of that law specified that as of February 10, 2009, "it shall be unlawful for any person to manufacture for sale, offer for sale, distribute in commerce, or import into the United States any children's toy or child care article that contains concentrations of more than 0.1 percent of" DEHP, DBP, or BBP and "it shall be unlawful for any person to manufacture for sale, offer for sale, distribute in commerce, or import into the United States any children's toy that can be placed in a child's mouth or child care article that contains concentrations of more than 0.1 percent of" DINP, DIDP, and DnOP. Furthermore, the law requires the establishment of a permanent review board to determine the safety of other phthalates. Prior to this legislation, the Consumer Product Safety Commission had determined that voluntary withdrawals of DEHP and diisononyl phthalate (DINP) from teethers, pacifiers, and rattles had eliminated the risk to children, and advised against enacting a phthalate ban.

In 1986, California voters approved an initiative to address concerns about exposure to toxic chemicals. That initiative became the Safe Drinking Water and Toxic Enforcement Act of 1986, also called Proposition 65. In December 2013, DINP was listed as a chemical "known to the State of California to cause cancer" Beginning in December 2014, companies with ten or more employees manufacturing, distributing or selling the product(s) containing DINP were required to provide a clear and reasonable warning for that product. The California Office of Environmental Health Hazard Assessment, charged with maintaining the Proposition 65 list and enforcing its provisions, has implemented a "No Significant Risk Level" of 146 μg/day for DINP.

The CDC provided a 2011 public health statement on diethyl phthalate describing regulations and guidelines concerning its possible harmful health effects. Under laws for Superfund sites, the Environmental Protection Agency named diethyl phthalate as a hazardous substance. The Occupational Safety and Health Administration stated that the maximum amount of diethyl phthalate allowed in workroom air during an 8-hour workday, 40-hour workweek, is 5 milligrams per cubic meter.

== Identification in plastics ==
Some "Type 3" plastics contain Phthalates.

Phthalates are used in some, but not all, PVC formulations, and there are no specific labeling requirements for phthalates. PVC plastics are typically used for various containers and hard packaging, medical tubing and bags, and are labeled "Type 3". However, the presence of phthalates rather than other plasticizers is not marked on PVC items. Only unplasticized PVC (uPVC), which is mainly used as a hard construction material, has no plasticizers. If a more accurate test is needed, chemical analysis, for example by gas chromatography or liquid chromatography, can establish the presence of phthalates.

Polyethylene terephthalate (PET, PETE, Terylene, Dacron) is the main substance used to package bottled water and many sodas. Products containing PETE are labeled "Type 1" (with a "1" in the recycle triangle). Although the word "phthalate" appears in the name, PETE does not use phthalates as plasticizers. The terephthalate polymer PETE and the phthalate ester plasticizers are chemically different substances. Despite this, however, many studies have found phthalates, such as DEHP in bottled water and soda. One hypothesis is that these may have been introduced during plastic recycling.

== See also ==
- Xenoestrogen
- Non-phthalate plasticizers such as
  - 1,2-Cyclohexane dicarboxylic acid diisononyl ester,
  - Dioctyl terephthalate, and
  - Citrates
- Antiandrogens in the environment
