= 1,2-Cyclohexane dicarboxylic acid diisononyl ester =

Names
- Preferred IUPAC name Bis(7-methyloctyl) cyclohexane-1,2-dicarboxylate
- Other names Cyclohexane-1,2-dicarboxylic acid diisononyl ester; Hexamoll DINCH (tradename)

Identifiers
CAS Number	166412-78-8
3D model (JSmol)	Interactive image
ChEMBL	ChEMBL3182578
ChemSpider	9699466
ECHA InfoCard	100.121.507
EC Number	605-439-7
PubChem CID	11524680
UNII	H26MNT7GT7
CompTox Dashboard (EPA)	DTXSID20274044
- InChI: InChI=1S/C26H48O4/c1-21(2)15-9-5-7-13-19-29-25(27)23-17-11-12-18-24(23)26(28)30-20-14-8-6-10-16-22(3)4/h21-24H,5-20H2,1-4H3 Key: HORIEOQXBKUKGQ-UHFFFAOYSA-N
- SMILES: O=C(OCCCCCCC(C)C)C1C(C(=O)OCCCCCCC(C)C)CCCC1

Properties
Chemical formula	C_{26}H_{48}O_{4}
Molar mass	424.666 g·mol^{−1}
Appearance	colorless liquid
Odor	almost odorless
Density	0.944–0.954 g·cm^{−3}
Melting point	Pour point: −54 °C (−65 °F; 219 K)
Boiling point	394 °C

Hazards
Safety data sheet (SDS)	BASF Safety Data Sheet
- Except where otherwise noted, data are given for materials in their standard state (at 25 °C [77 °F], 100 kPa). verify (what is ?) Infobox references

1,2-Cyclohexane dicarboxylic acid diisononyl ester (DINCH) is a mixture of organic compounds with the formula C_{6}H_{10}(CO_{2}C_{9}H_{19})_{2}. DINCH is colorless oil. It is used as a plasticizer for the manufacture of flexible plastic articles in sensitive application areas such as toys, medical devices, and food packaging. It is of interest as an alternative for phthalate plasticizers, which are implicated as endocrine disruptors.

== Production ==
DINCH can be produced by the catalytic hydrogenation of diisononyl phthalate. Alternatively it can be prepared by Diels-Alder reaction of a diisononyl maleate with 1,3-butadiene followed by hydrogenation. In the case of the catalytic hydrogenation the aromatic, planar part of the diisononyl phthalate is transformed to a cyclohexane ring. Commercial DINCH consists of 90% of the cis and 10% of the trans (chiral) isomers.

BASF sells DINCH under the tradename of Hexamoll DINCH.

== Use ==
In February 2009, Mattel and Learning Curve confirmed that they were substituting phthalates with Hexamoll DINCH and citrate-based plasticizers.

== Regulatory approval ==
=== Food contact ===
In the European Union, the European Food Safety Authority approved DINCH for a wide variety of food contact applications in October 2006. In 2007 DINCH has been added to Annex III of the "Directive 2002/72/EC relating to plastic materials and articles intended to come into contact with food". The EU Directive 2002/72 has meanwhile been superseded by Regulation (EU) No 10/2011. Hexamoll DINCH is listed in Annex I of Regulation (EU) No 10/2011 by as Food Conctact Material (FCM) 775 by its chemical name, i.e. as 1,2-cyclohexanedicarboxylic acid, diisononylester.

=== Toys ===
In the European Union 1,2-cyclohexane dicarboxylic acid diisononyl ester was not listed in directive 2005/84/EC. These restrictions for certain phthalates are now transferred into Annex XVII, 51 and 52 of Regulation (EC) No 1907/2006 which ban the use of certain phthalates in toys and childcare articles and thus DINCH can be used safely in toys and childcare articles.

== Possible health effects ==
A research group from Harvard and CDC found suggestive negative associations between urinary MHiNCH, the monoester of DINCH, a minor urinary metabolite. Their research at a fertility clinic showed that women who had been exposed to DINCH had lower, but statistically not significant estradiol hormone levels and fewer, though not statistically significant number of oocytes in their ovaries. However, urinary MHiNCH concentrations were unrelated to mature oocyte yield and endometrial wall thickness. The results are inconclusive and therefore, the authors suggest that more epidemiological studies would be needed for clarification.

The Swedish IVL Environmental Research Institute and researches from the Department of Environmental Science and Analytical Chemistry of Stockholm University recommend that "children's exposure to DINCH should be investigated in more detail and exposure to the general population should be closely monitored" as DINCH is used as an alternative plasticizer in e.g. children's toys.

The Chronic Hazard Advisory Panel of the U.S. Consumer Product Safety Commission "strongly encourages the appropriate U.S. agencies to obtain the necessary toxicological and exposure data to assess any potential risk from DINX" because of "lack of publicly available information".

A French group from the University of Clermont-Ferrand noted that clinical data and data regarding the migration from Medical Devices would be rare. The Project was funded by the French Agency for the Safety of Health Products (ANSM). It remains unclear why this Research Group was not able to identify the published human biomonitoring data which give a perfect overview on population exposure of alternative plasticizers (e.g. DINCH/DINX) and their metabolites.

A report by the Danish Ministry of the Environment states that the available data for DINCH do not indicate a need for further investigations. Further, the conclusion is that 3 of the evaluated plasticizers, namely the substances COMGHA, DEHT and DINCH may be seen as the most promising alternatives, as these substances have an extended data set (complying to Annex X data requirements, i.e. a two-generation reproduction study) without indicating specific concern for reproductive toxicity or endocrine activity. Toxicogenomic screening showed that 648 genes were significantly changed after 48 hours exposure to DINCH suggesting that "DINCH is biologically active".

A 2022 Canadian study indicated DEHP and DINCH have similar influence on rat mammary glands.
