= Dibutoxy ethyl phthalate =

Names
- Preferred IUPAC name Bis(2-butoxyethyl) benzene-1,2-dicarboxylate
- Other names: Bis(2-butoxyethyl) phthalate; Butyl glycol phthalate; Dibutoxyethyl phthalate; Dibutylglycol phthalate; Kesscoflex; Kronisol; Palatinol K

Identifiers
CAS Number	117-83-9
3D model (JSmol)	Interactive image
ChEBI	CHEBI:79937
ChEMBL	ChEMBL3182679
ChemSpider	8042
ECHA InfoCard	100.003.831
EC Number	204-213-1
KEGG	C15438
PubChem CID	8345
UNII	N3MI1R200O
CompTox Dashboard (EPA)	DTXSID9047174
- InChI: InChI=1S/C20H30O6/c1-3-5-11-23-13-15-25-19(21)17-9-7-8-10-18(17)20(22)26-16-14-24-12-6-4-2/h7-10H,3-6,11-16H2,1-2H3 Key: CMCJNODIWQEOAI-UHFFFAOYSA-N
- SMILES: CCCCOCCOC(=O)C1=CC=CC=C1C(=O)OCCOCCCC

Properties
Chemical formula	C_{20}H_{30}O_{6}
Molar mass	366.454 g·mol^{−1}
Appearance	Colorless liquid
Density	1.06 g/cm^{3} (20 °C)
Melting point	−55 °C (−67 °F; 218 K)
Boiling point	270 °C (518 °F; 543 K)
Solubility in water	low
Solubility	soluble in organic solvents
Vapor pressure	0.00217 mmHg
Refractive index (n_{D})	1.486 (20 °C/D)
Viscosity	42 mPa·s (20 °C)

Hazards
- GHS labelling
Pictograms	(GHS09: Environmental hazard)
Signal word	Warning
Hazard statements	H413
Precautionary statements	P273, P501
NFPA 704 (fire diamond)	1 1 0
Flash point	208 °C (406 °F; 481 K)
- Lethal dose or concentration (LD, LC)
LD_{50} (median dose)	8380 mg/kg (oral rat)
- Except where otherwise noted, data are given for materials in their standard state (at 25 °C [77 °F], 100 kPa). Infobox references

Dibutoxy ethyl phthalate is an organic compound and phthalate ester, baring 2-butoxyethanol groups. Like most phthalates it is nonvolatile, and remains liquid over a wide range of temperatures. Although its water solubility is low, it remains one of the most water soluble of the common phthalates.

== Uses ==
It is used as a plasticizer in polyvinyl chloride, polyvinyl acetate and cellulose acetate. It is resistant to microbial attack.

It is used to improve the collection efficiency of specialized filter papers (IP 1478) designed for bulk particulate and trace element sampling in the atmosphere.

== Safety ==
Bis(2-butoxyethyl) phthalate exposure has been associated with reproductive toxicity and endocrine disruption.
