= Benzyl benzoate/disulfiram =

Combination drug

Combination of
- Benzyl benzoate: antiparasitic

Clinical data
- Trade names: Tenutex
- ATC code: P03AA54 (WHO)

Identifiers
- CAS Number: 92483-53-9

Benzyl benzoate/disulfiram (trade name Tenutex) is a combination drug used in the treatment of scabies. It consists of the antiparasitic insecticides benzyl benzoate and disulfiram.
