= DPHP =

Names
- Preferred IUPAC name Bis(2-propylheptyl) benzene-1,2-dicarboxylate
- Other names Bis(2-propylheptyl) phthalate

Identifiers
CAS Number	53306-54-0
3D model (JSmol)	Interactive image
ChemSpider	83367
ECHA InfoCard	100.053.137
EC Number	258-469-4
PubChem CID	92344
CompTox Dashboard (EPA)	DTXSID5052173
- InChI: InChI=1S/C28H46O4/c1-5-9-11-17-23(15-7-3)21-31-27(29)25-19-13-14-20-26(25)28(30)32-22-24(16-8-4)18-12-10-6-2/h13-14,19-20,23-24H,5-12,15-18,21-22H2,1-4H3 Key: MTYUOIVEVPTXFX-UHFFFAOYSA-N
- SMILES: CCCCCC(CCC)COC(=O)c1ccccc1C(=O)OCC(CCC)CCCCC

Properties
Chemical formula	C_{28}H_{46}O_{4}
Molar mass	446.672 g·mol^{−1}
Appearance	Clear oily liquid
Density	0.957-0.965 g/cm^{3}
Solubility in water	< 0.01 mg/L
Refractive index (n_{D})	1.482-1.484
Viscosity	120-130 mPas
- Except where otherwise noted, data are given for materials in their standard state (at 25 °C [77 °F], 100 kPa). Infobox references

Di(2-propylheptyl) phthalate (also known as bis(2-propylheptyl) benzene-1,2-dicarboxylate, di(propylheptyl) orthophthalate, or DPHP) is an organic compound with the formula C_{28}H_{46}O_{4}. It is a phthalate and is the diester of phthalic acid and the 10-carbon branched-chain alcohol 2-propylheptanol. This colorless, viscous liquid is used for softening PVC plastics and is a general purpose PVC plasticizer. It possesses very good plasticizing properties and may be used as a direct replacement for DEHP and DINP in many applications.

== History of discovery ==
The introduction of Di(2-propylheptyl) phthalate (DPHP) was driven by increasing regulatory scrutiny and health concerns associated with traditional plasticizers.

DPHP was developed to meet the demand for plasticizers with improved safety profiles, particularly in applications involving human contact. As a result of its production through the esterification of phthalic anhydride with 2-propylheptanol, it results in a compound with low volatility and high thermal stability, making it suitable for various applications, including automotive interiors, wire and cable insulation, and flooring materials.

The compound gained regulatory attention in the European Union, where it was included in the Community Rolling Action Plan (CoRAP) under the REACH regulation in 2014. This inclusion was due to concerns about its widespread use, potential endocrine-disrupting properties, and exposure risks to sensitive populations. Germany was tasked with evaluating DPHP's health and environmental impacts, with the assessment process beginning in 2020.

Research into DPHP's metabolism and exposure markers has been conducted to better understand its behavior in biological systems. A 2019 study utilized ultra-performance liquid chromatography-mass spectrometry (UPLC-MS) in a rat model to identify potential biomarkers for DPHP exposure, aiding in the assessment of human exposure levels.
