= Diisodecyl phthalate =

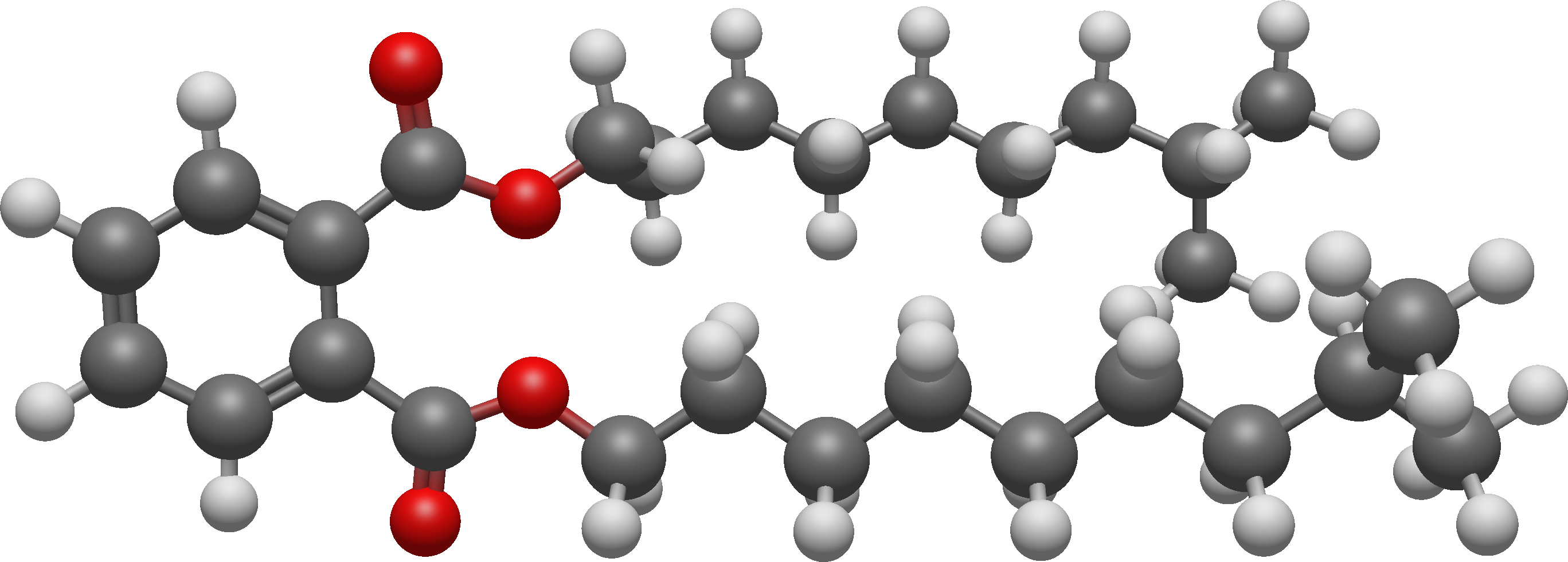

Names
- Preferred IUPAC name Bis(8-methylnonyl) benzene-1,2-dicarboxylate
- Other names Bis(8-methylnonyl) phthalate Bis(isodecyl) phthalate

Identifiers
| CAS Number | 26761-40-0 |
| 3D model (JSmol) | Interactive image |
| ChemSpider | 30996 |
| ECHA InfoCard | 100.043.601 |
| PubChem CID | 33599 |
| UNII | WF93T741QI |
| CompTox Dashboard (EPA) | DTXSID50274032 |
- InChI: InChI=1S/C28H46O4/c1-23(2)17-11-7-5-9-15-21-31-27(29)25-19-13-14-20-26(25)28(30)32-22-16-10-6-8-12-18-24(3)4/h13-14,19-20,23-24H,5-12,15-18,21-22H2,1-4H3 Key: ZVFDTKUVRCTHQE-UHFFFAOYSA-N
- SMILES: O=C(OCCCCCCCC(C)C)C1=CC=CC=C1C(OCCCCCCCC(C)C)=O

Properties
| Chemical formula | C_{28}H_{46}O_{4} |
| Molar mass | 446.672 g·mol^{−1} |
| Density | 0.96-0.97 g/cm^{3} at 20 °C |
| Melting point | −50 °C (−58 °F; 223 K) |
| Boiling point | 250 to 257 °C (482 to 495 °F; 523 to 530 K) at 0.5 kPa |
- Except where otherwise noted, data are given for materials in their standard state (at 25 °C [77 °F], 100 kPa). verify (what is ?) Infobox references

Diisodecyl phthalate (DIDP) is a commonly used plasticizer used in the production of plastic and plastic coating to increase flexibility. It is a mixture of compounds derived from the esterification of phthalic acid and isomeric decyl alcohols.

The coating on furnishings, cookware, pharmaceutical pills, food wrappers and many other products may have DIDP or other phthalates in them. There has been recent concern in the US and European Union for their toxicity and bioaccumulative quality. The European Union has set a maximum specific migration limit (SML) from food contact materials of 9 mg/kg food for the sum of diisodecyl phthalates and diisononyl phthalates.

DIDP has been listed since 2007 under Proposition 65 as a substance known to the state of California to cause reproductive toxicity. The similar compound DINP is also listed.

In 2013, ECHA's Risk Assessment Committee (RAC) concluded that Di-isodecyl phthalate (DIDP) does not warrant classification for reprotoxic effects under the EU's Classification, Labelling and Packaging (CLP) regulation.

== See also ==
- DPHP, a similar phthalate ester
