= Diisobutyl phthalate =

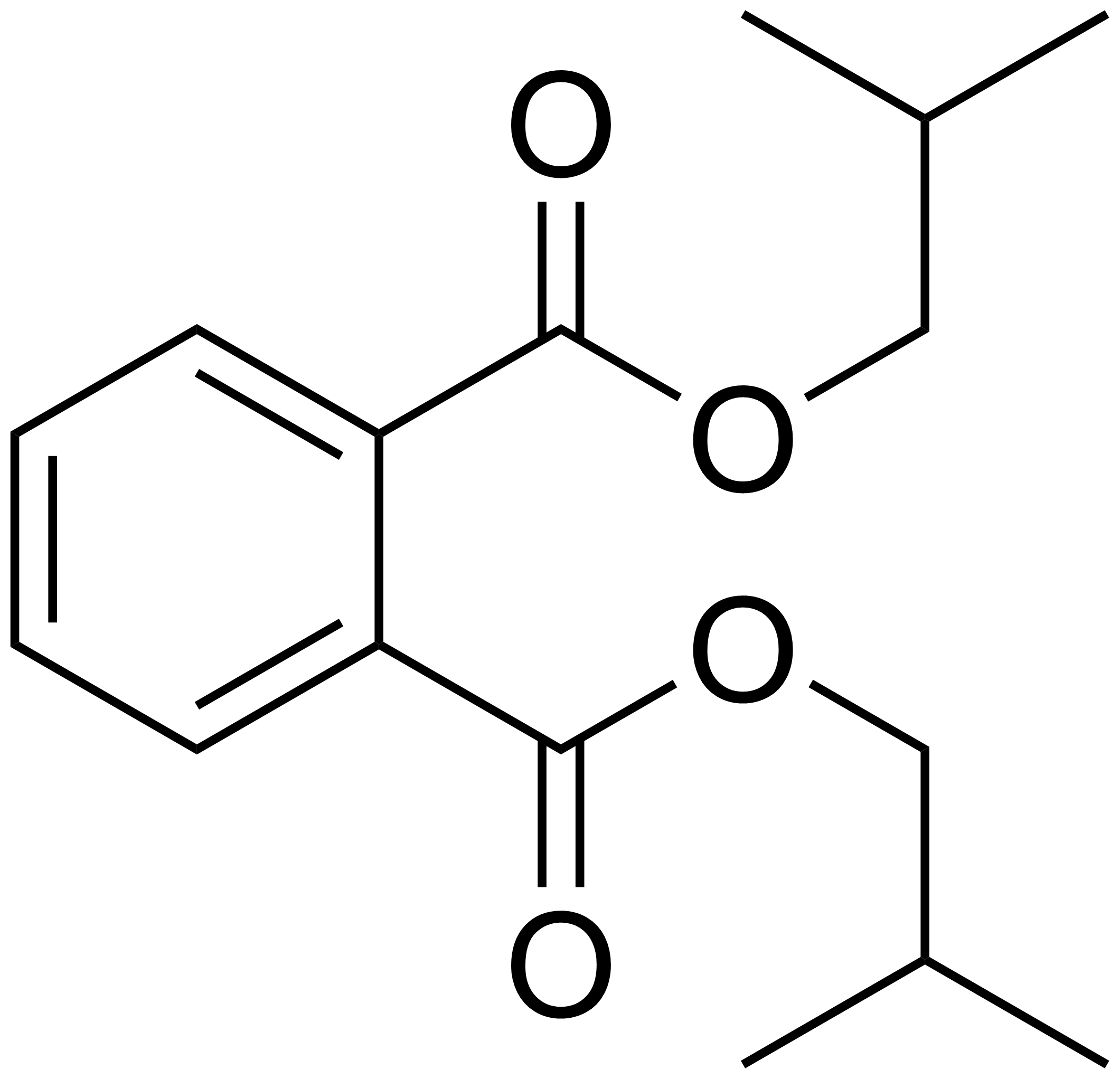

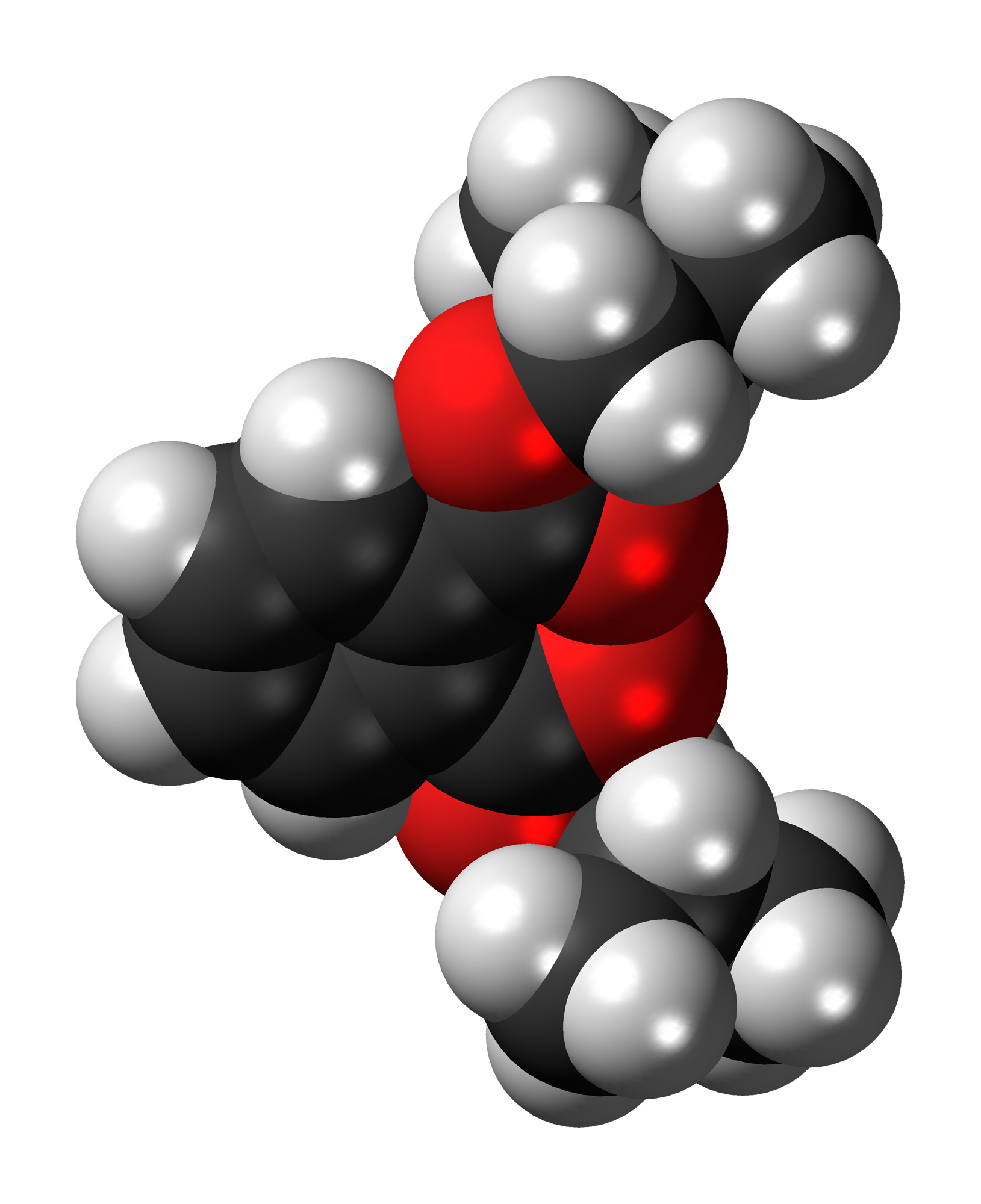

Names
- Preferred IUPAC name Bis(2-methylpropyl) benzene-1,2-dicarboxylate
- Other names Diisobutyl phthalate Di-iso-butyl phthalate Di(i-butyl)phthalate; Diisobutyl ester of phthalic acid 1,2-benzenedicarboxylic acid Bis(2-methylpropyl)ester; Di(isobutyl) 1,2-benzenedicarboxylate Isobutyl-O-phthalate; DIBP; DiBP; Palatinol IC

Identifiers
CAS Number	84-69-5
3D model (JSmol)	Interactive image
ChEBI	CHEBI:79053
ChEMBL	ChEMBL1370662
ChemSpider	6524
ECHA InfoCard	100.001.412
EC Number	201-553-2
KEGG	C15205
PubChem CID	6782
RTECS number	TI1225000
UNII	IZ67FTN290
CompTox Dashboard (EPA)	DTXSID9022522
- InChI: InChI=1S/C16H22O4/c1-11(2)9-19-15(17)13-7-5-6-8-14(13)16(18)20-10-12(3)4/h5-8,11-12H,9-10H2,1-4H3 Key: MGWAVDBGNNKXQV-UHFFFAOYSA-N; InChI=1/C16H22O4/c1-11(2)9-19-15(17)13-7-5-6-8-14(13)16(18)20-10-12(3)4/h5-8,11-12H,9-10H2,1-4H3 Key: MGWAVDBGNNKXQV-UHFFFAOYAA
- SMILES: O=C(OCC(C)C)c1ccccc1C(=O)OCC(C)C

Properties
Chemical formula	C_{16}H_{22}O_{4}
Molar mass	278.348 g·mol^{−1}
Appearance	Colorless viscous liquid
Density	1.038 g/cm^{3}
Melting point	−37 °C (−35 °F; 236 K)
Boiling point	320 °C (608 °F; 593 K)
Solubility in water	1 mg/L at 20 °C
log P	4.11
Vapor pressure	0.01 Pa at 20 °C

Hazards
- GHS labelling
Pictograms	(GHS08: Health hazard)
Signal word	Danger
Hazard statements	H360Df
Precautionary statements	P201, P202, P281, P308+P313, P405, P501
NFPA 704 (fire diamond)	2 1 0
Flash point	185 °C (365 °F; 458 K) c.c.
Autoignition temperature	400 °C (752 °F; 673 K)
- Except where otherwise noted, data are given for materials in their standard state (at 25 °C [77 °F], 100 kPa). verify (what is ?) Infobox references

Diisobutyl phthalate (DIBP) is a phthalate ester having the structural formula C_{6}H_{4}(COOCH_{2}CH(CH_{3})_{2})_{2}. It is formed by the reaction of isobutanol and phthalic anhydride. This and other phthalates are used as plasticizers due to their influence on the flexibility and durability of plastics. They are found in many industrial and personal products, such as lacquers, nail polish and cosmetics. DIBP can be absorbed via oral ingestion and dermal exposure. When it comes to excretion, DIBP is first converted into the hydrolytic monoester monoisobutyl phthalate (MIBP). The primary excretory route is urine, with biliary excretion being noted in minor amounts. DIBP has lower density and freezing point than the related compound dibutyl phthalate (DBP).

== Industry use ==
It is used as a plasticizer additive in a range of plastic and rubber materials. It has low volatility, which makes it ideal for use in products that require long-lasting flexibility, e.g. automotive parts, wire and cable insulation, and flooring. It is dense and water-insoluble.

DIBP has been found to be relatively non-toxic, but high levels of exposure to the compound may cause irritation to the eyes, skin and respiratory tract. However, in recent years, concerns have been raised about the potential health risks of exposure to phthalates, including DIBP. Therefore, several countries have restricted or even banned the use of certain phthalates in products. DIBP has been detected in various environmental matrices, such as air, water, and sediment. DIBP is known to bioaccumulate in certain aquatic species

== Synthesis ==
DIBP is synthesized by reaction of phthalic anhydride with isobutanol. Various acids are used as a catalyst, such as sulfuric acid, sulfonated graphene, or iron(III) chloride. Water is a byproduct.

Using sulfuric acid, the yield is around 61%:

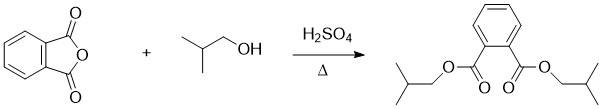

=== Optimization ===
Sulfonated graphene is a heterogeneous catalyst that has several advantages over traditional liquid acids like sulfuric acid. Sulfonated graphene can be easily separated from the reaction mixture by filtration and can be reused multiple times without reduction in activity. Furthermore, sulfonated graphene is environmentally friendly, as it does not produce hazardous waste materials that are typically generated during the use of traditional liquid acid catalysts. This method has a 95% yield.

Lewis acids, such as FeCl_{3}, can also be used as the catalyst. The Lewis acid catalysis process can be run at lower temperatures (50-100 °C), and gives a yield of 86%.

== Available forms ==
Diisobutyl phthalate is clear, colourless, oily liquid form with a mild odor. It is insoluble in water but soluble in many organic solvents.

DIBP can be sold as a pure substance or as a component of mixtures with other phthalate plasticizers or chemicals. Examples are dioctyl phthalate (DOP), diisononyl-phthalate (DINP), or bis(2-ethylhexyl) phthalate (DEHP). It may be used as a component in formulations of several products including adhesives, paints, coatings and lubricants. DIBP also may be present in consumer products such as toys, vinyl flooring, food packaging, and as a plasticizer or as a component of plastic formulations. In many of these products DIBP is now prohibited to be used in formulations according to REACH.

== Environmental reactions ==
DIBP can undergo various reactions that may impact the environment. Examples include:

- Hydrolysis: Hydrolyzation of DIBP can be done by enzymes, bacteria, and other microorganisms in the environment to form phthalic acid and isobutyl alcohol. This can lead to the breakdown and the eventual degradation of DIBP in the soil and water supply
- Photodegradation: DIBP can undergo photodegradation by exposure to the sunlight. This can lead to the formation of several degradation products, including phthalic acid, isobutyraldehyde, and other aldehydes.
- Biodegradation: DIBP can be degraded by microorganisms in soil and in the water. This can transform it into other compounds such as phthalic acid and various isobutyl alcohol derivatives.
- Sorption: DIBP can adsorb or sorb onto soil and sediment particles, which can limit its mobility and availability for biological or chemical degradations and reactions.
- Oxidation: DIBP can be oxidized in the presence of ozone or other reactive oxygen species. The formation of various oxidation products, including aldehydes, ketones, and carboxylic acids can be expected

These reactions can impact the persistence, bioaccumulation, and toxicity in the environment and may have implications for human and ecosystem health.

== Mechanisms of actions ==
=== PPARγ pathway ===
The effects of DiBP exposure are mainly realized through its activation of peroxisome proliferator-activated receptor gamma (PPARγ). PPARs are ligand-activated nuclear transcription factors, the family consists of PPARα, PPARβ/δ and PPARγ. There are two isoforms of PPARγ, PPARγ2 is mainly present on cells in adipose tissue, whereas PPARγ1 is found on multiple cells like those in the gut, brain, blood vessels, and some immune and inflammatory cells. Transcriptional regulation through PPARs requires the formation of a heterodimer with retinoid X receptor (RXR). Upon activation by DiBP this PPARγ/RXR heterodimer binds to a DNA sequence called the PPAR response element (PPRE). Binding of the transcription factor to this response element can result in either up- or down-regulation of genes. PPARγ is involved in lipid metabolism and storage as well as glucose metabolism through improving insulin sensitivity, so binding of DiBP leads to altered leptin and insulin levels. DiBP also leads to a down-regulation of proteins involved in steroid production, resulting in higher levels of androgenic hormones.

=== Cytokine-cytokine receptor pathway ===
Another type of pathway affected by DiBP exposure is the cytokine-cytokine receptor pathway. There are two pathways affected: the tumour necrosis factor receptor superfamily (TNFRSF) and the prolactin receptor pathway, both of which affect spermatogenesis. In zebra fish, there are two types of TNFRSF: tnfrsf1a and tnfrsf1b, the latter of which is down-regulated by DiBP. Tnfrsf1b is involved in regeneration and tissue repair and its down-regulation has been shown to increase apoptosis of sperm cells. Prolactin (PLR) on the other hand is up-regulated as a result of DiBP exposure. Prolactin has many roles, including roles in cell regeneration and regulation of the male reproductive system. High PLR concentrations as a result of phthalate exposure has been linked to reduced sperm concentrations in both adult men and zebra fish.

== Metabolism ==
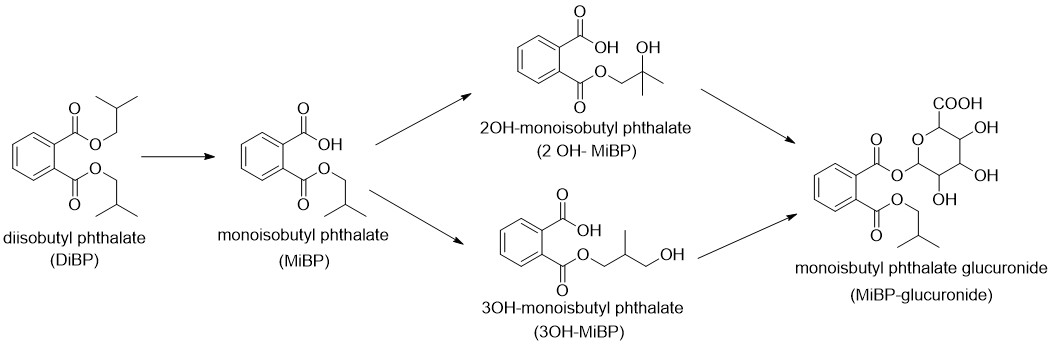
The metabolism of DiBP to the simple monoester MiBP with possible further oxidation to either 2OH-MiBP or 3OH-MiBP. After oxidation a glucuronidation reaction can take place, resulting in MiBP-glucuronide.

Upon entering circulation DiBP is quickly metabolized and excreted through urine, with metabolites reaching peak concentrations 2–4 hours after administration. The main metabolite of DiBP is mono-isobutyl phthalate (MiBP), which makes up 70% of the excretion products. MiBP can be oxidized to either 2OH-mono-isobutyl phthalate (2OH-MiBP) or 3OH-mono-isobutyl phthalate (3OH-MiBP), which make up 20% and 1% of the excretion products respectively. These reactions are likely catalyzed by cytochrome P450 in the liver. The ratio between MiBP and the oxidized metabolites changes depending on the amount of time that has passed since exposure. The ratio between MiBP and 2OH-MiBP and that between MiBP and 3OH-MiBP show a similar trend. With the ratios being high, around 20-30:1, shortly after exposure and dropping gradually as more time passes to rest around 2-5:1. Therefore, a high ratio of oxidized metabolites to the monoester metabolite suggests that there was recent exposure to DiBP, within a few hours of measuring, while a lower ratio suggests that there has been more time since exposure. In addition to oxidation, MiBP can also undergo a glucuronidation reaction, resulting in the metabolite MiBP-glucuronide.

== Toxicity ==
There's insufficient data to determine if DIBP is associated with acute dermal or inhalation toxicity, eye or dermal irritation, or sensitization. There is evidence on DIBP being a subchronic toxicant. Exposure to the compound can induce changes in body weight, liver weight, reproductive effects, and developmental effects like testicular weight, spermatogenesis, fetal body weight, anogenital distance in male and female rats, and testicular testosterone production, among others.

Biomonitoring studies show that exposures to DIBP have grown recently, presumably as a result of DIBPs use as a substitute for other phthalates such as dibutyl phthalate (DBP) in plastics. In the United States, for instance, the prevalence of MIBP detection in urine has risen from 72% of the general population in 2001–2002 to 96% in 2009–2010, according to data from the National Health and Nutrition Examination Survey (NHANES).

The main issue with phthalate exposure is typically male reproductive toxicity, which is a risk that many phthalates share.

== Effect on animals ==
A study conducted on rats shows that high dosage of DIBP administered by gavage to pregnant female rats between gestational days (GD) 6 and 20, exhibited signs of embryotoxicity and teratogenicity. The growing male reproductive system was negatively impacted by DIBP, which is typical for phthalate esters. When phthalates are exposed in utero during the process of male sexual differentiation, a phenotype known as "phthalate syndrome" is created. This syndrome is characterized by underdevelopment of the male reproductive system, decreased anogenital distance (AGD), retention of the nipple in a female-like manner, and germ cell toxicity, among other things. Therefore, these effects can be connected to decreased insulin-like-3 (INSL3) hormone, which controls transabdominal testicular descent, decreased androgen production in the testicles, which is essential for male sexual development, and disruption of seminiferous cord formation, Sertoli cells, and germ cell development via an unknown mode of action (MOA).

Despite the limited studies in other species, research on zebrafish shows that environmental exposure to DBP and DIBP can have serious consequences for fish offspring. As they go up the food chain and into polluted water, these phthalates can build up in aquatic organisms. Fish are susceptible to environmental toxins in their early lives, whether they are exposed to them directly or indirectly through their parents.

Species	Exposure Route	Dose	Effect	Reference
Sprague-Dawley Rats	Oral (by gavage)	250, 500, 750, and 1000 mg/kg/day	Pregnant females: Transient decrease in body weight gain, observed at 500 mg/kg and higher. Embryolethality and teratogenicity at 750 and 1000 mg/kg. Male fetuses: Undescended testis at 500 mg/kg. The degree of transabdominal migration of testis in relation to the bladder were disturbed at 500 mg/kg and above.	
Zebrafish	Chemical exposure	10, 103 and 1038 μg L^{−1}, (LC50) was 1037.7 μg L^{−1}	Parental individual DIBP exposure disturbed key genes in circadian rhythm and phototransduction signal pathways, which could influence the eye development of F1 larvae.	
Wistar Rats	Oral (by gavage)	600 mg/kg	Disrupt fetal testicular development. AGD was reduced at GD 19 and GD 20/21 in males and increased in females exposed to DIBP. It also reduced bodyweights of male and female fetuses.	
Sprague-Dawley Rats	Oral (by gavage)	100, 300, 600, and 900 mg/kg/day	Reduced maternal body weight gain from 73 g in controls to 48 and 43 g in the 600 and 900 mg/kg/day dose groups, respectively.	
Wistar Rats	Oral (by gavage)	600 mg/kg bw/day	Reductions in fetal plasma leptin levels and in fetal insulin levels. Prenatal exposure disrupts fetal testosterone production in male rats by reducing the expression of several genes and proteins involved in steroidogenesis. In females, increases ovarian aromatase gene expression. DIBP also affected PPAR expression in the liver and testes.	
Sprague-Dawley Rats	Oral	100, 300, 600, or 900 mg/kg/day	Significantly reduced T production. Reduced fetal AGD, T levels, and Insl3.	
Sprague-Dawley Rats	Oral (by gavage)	125, 250, 500, 625 mg/kg/day	Doses ≥ 250 mg DIBP/(kg day) resulted in reduced AGD, and retained thoracic areolas/nipples at both early postnatal life, and adult necropsy.	

== See also ==
- Phthalates
- Dibutyl phthalate
- Phthalic anhydride
- Isobutanol
