= Dimethyl phthalate =

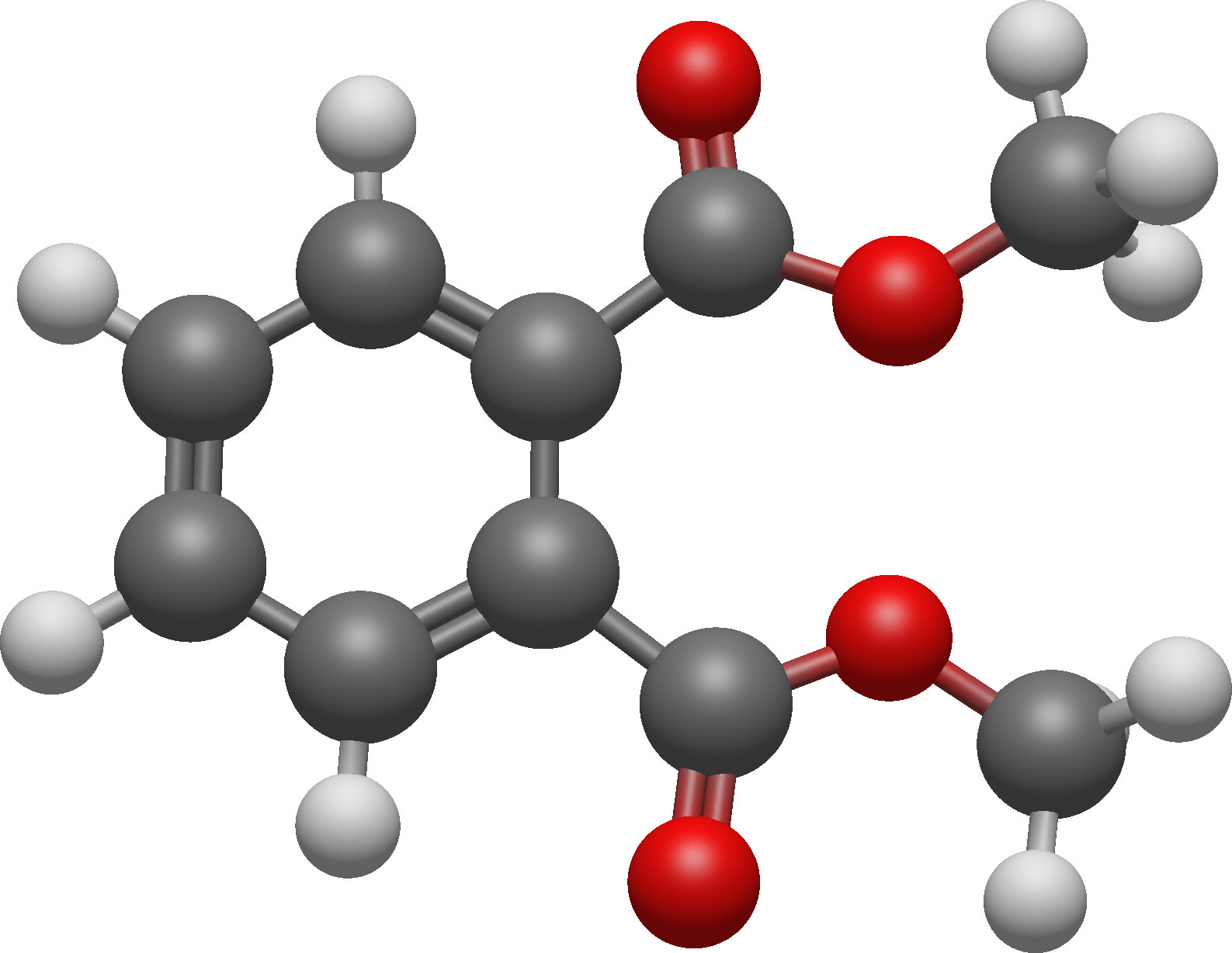

Names
- Preferred IUPAC name Dimethyl benzene-1,2-dicarboxylate
- Other names Dimethyl phthalate

Identifiers
CAS Number	131-11-3
3D model (JSmol)	Interactive image
ChEBI	CHEBI:4609
ChEMBL	ChEMBL323348
ChemSpider	13837329
DrugBank	DB13336
ECHA InfoCard	100.004.557
EC Number	205-011-6
KEGG	C11233
PubChem CID	8554
UNII	08X7F5UDJM
UN number	3082
CompTox Dashboard (EPA)	DTXSID3022455
- InChI: InChI=1S/C10H10O4/c1-13-9(11)7-5-3-4-6-8(7)10(12)14-2/h3-6H,1-2H3 Key: NIQCNGHVCWTJSM-UHFFFAOYSA-N; InChI=1/C10H10O4/c1-13-9(11)7-5-3-4-6-8(7)10(12)14-2/h3-6H,1-2H3 Key: NIQCNGHVCWTJSM-UHFFFAOYAF
- SMILES: O=C(OC)c1ccccc1C(=O)OC

Properties
Chemical formula	C_{10}H_{10}O_{4}
Molar mass	194.184 g/mol
Appearance	Colorless oily liquid
Odor	slight aromatic odor
Density	1.19 g/cm^{3}
Melting point	2 °C (36 °F; 275 K)
Boiling point	283 to 284 °C (541 to 543 °F; 556 to 557 K)
Solubility in water	0.4% (20°C)
Vapor pressure	0.01 mmHg (20°C)

Pharmacology
ATC code	P03BX02 (WHO) QP53GX02 (WHO)

Hazards
NFPA 704 (fire diamond)	1 1 0
Flash point	146 °C (295 °F; 419 K)
Autoignition temperature	460 °C (860 °F; 733 K)
Explosive limits	0.9%-?
- Lethal dose or concentration (LD, LC)
LD_{50} (median dose)	6900 mg/kg (rat, oral); 1000 mg/kg (rabbit, oral); 2400 mg/kg (guinea pig, oral); 6800 mg/kg (rat, oral); 6800 mg/kg (mouse, oral); 4400 mg/kg (rabbit, oral); 2400 mg/kg (guinea pig, oral)
LC_{Lo} (lowest published)	9630 mg/m^{3}
- NIOSH (US health exposure limits)
PEL (Permissible)	TWA 5 mg/m^{3}
REL (Recommended)	TWA 5 mg/m^{3}
IDLH (Immediate danger)	2000 mg/m^{3}
- Except where otherwise noted, data are given for materials in their standard state (at 25 °C [77 °F], 100 kPa). verify (what is ?) Infobox references

Dimethyl phthalate (DMP) is an organic compound and phthalate ester. it is a colourless and oily liquid that is soluble in organic solvents, but which is only poorly soluble in water (~4 g/L).

It is used in a variety of products and is most commonly used as insect repellent such as ectoparasiticide for mosquitoes and flies for animal livestock. The short-chain or low molecular weight phthalate is also frequently used in consumer products such as cosmetics, ink, soap, household cleaning supplies, etc. Other uses of DMP include solid rocket propellants (as a stabilizer) and plastics.

The U.S. Environmental Protection Agency has classified Dimethyl phthalate as not classifiable for human carcinogenicity. Its oral LD_{50} is 4390 to 8200 mg/kg bw/d in rats and the dermal LD50 is 38000 mg/kg bw in rats and more than 4800 mg/kg bw in guinea pigs.

== Synthesis ==
Dimethyl phthalate is manufactured commercially via the esterification of phthalic anhydride with methanol. The reaction can be catalysed by a strong acid, such as sulfuric acid; various lewis acids may be used as an alterative, including complexes of titanium, zirconium or tin. Excess methanol is used to ensure complete conversion, with the remainder removed by distillation at the end.

== Applications ==
Unlike most other phthalate esters, dimethyl phthalate is rarely used as a plasticizer for PVC. It is considered too volatile and causes excessive fuming during PVC processing. It is a good plasticizer for cellulose-esters, including cellulose acetate, cellulose acetate butyrate and cellulose propionate compositions. Historically, this led to it being present in nail polish and some artificial nails but it is not commonly used today. It is used as a plasticizer for cellulose acetate phthalate, which is used to make enteric coatings for medicines. Other cosmetic uses include as a fixative for perfumes, although it is not as commonly used as DEP. Dimethyl phthalate is able to dissolve nitrocellulose which made it historically important in some automotive coatings and vanishes.

=== Insect repellent ===
DMP can be used as an insect repellent and is especially useful against ixodid ticks responsible for Lyme disease. DMP has been shown to deter species of mosquitoes such as Anopheles stephensi, Culex pipeins and Ades aegypti.

== Metabolism/Biotransformation ==
DMP administered orally in rats largely undergoes phase I biotransformation to monomethyl phthalate (MMP) via hydrolysis in the liver and intestinal mucosa. MMP may also be further hydrolysed to phthalic acid. However, low molecular weight phthalates such as MMP are primarily excreted as monoesters and do not undergo phase II biotransformation processes such as hydroxylation and oxidation unlike the well-known banned molecule DEHP.

== Human safety ==
Acute exposure to DMP via inhalation in humans and animals have shown to result in irritation to the eyes, nose and throat. Although some research has shown the association between the susceptibility of the reproductive system and phthalates esters, most phthalates demonstrate low acute toxicity.

The chronic (long term) effects, reproductive effects, and carcinogenicity of DMP on humans and animals have yet to be fully established as compared to some other phthalate esters. This is due to insufficient animal evidence and inadequate lifetime-exposure carcinogenicity studies available. However, DMP does appear to have less potential towards inducing health hazards than other phthalates, such as DEHP and BBP.

== Animal toxicity ==
Studies have shown that DMP is readily absorbed in the gastrointestinal tract of rats. After an orally administered dose of 0.1mL of DMP, about 77% of monomethyl phthalate and 8% of DMP have been detected in urine collected for 24 hours from male rats. Acute oral toxicity results in an LD50 of 8,2, 5,2, 2,9, 10,1 and 8,6 mg/kg for rats, rabbits, guinea pigs, chicks, and mice respectively. Another study on Sprague-Dawley albino rats resulted in a lower LD50 of 4,39 mg/kg in females and 5,12 mg/kg in males. Treatment was applied and for dead subjects, necropsy revealed toxic effects in the lungs, stomach and intestines of rats. Based on this animal data, DMP does not fit the definition of ''acute toxic'' under FHSA via oral exposure.

=== Hematoxicity ===
At high doses (1000 mg/kg), DMP may cause red blood cells (RBCs) to lose their oxygen-carrying function. In both in vitro and in vivo rat studies, DMP-incubated red blood cells released iron. Iron is the site of oxygen binding for hemoglobin, without it, hemoglobin is unable to bind to oxygen and transport it to the rest of the body. Release of iron from RBCs was not found in RBCs not incubated with DMP, nor at low and medium doses of DMP. One mechanism of iron release is the oxidative stress-induced on RBCs by DMP.

A separate study found that the oxidative stress induced by DMP also decreased the immune functions of erythrocytes. The oxidative stress damages the structure and function of erythrocytes, in particular RBC-complement 3b (C3b) receptors.

=== Hepatotoxicity ===
Animal studies on oral exposure of DMP in rats have established hepatotoxic effects including increased liver weight, elevated alkaline phosphatase activity and reduced cholesterol and lipid levels. Increased liver weight was identified in rats exposed to DMP concentrations of approximately 1,860 mg/kg-day; heightened alkaline phosphatase activity (indicating liver damage) followed prolonged dosage of 500 mg/kg–day; lowered cholesterol and lipid levels were observed after exposure to 107 mg/kg-day.

== Environmental toxicity ==
Environmental contamination by phthalates, inclusive of DMP, has been a pressing issue for human and marine health. DMP is readily released to the environment could potentially pose harmful risks of exposure on humans. Additionally, pollution of DMP into the environment could also be harmful to micro-organisms and aquatic animals.

=== Toxic effects on bacteria ===
A study on the environmental contamination of DMP has a direct influence on the cell function of Pseudomonas fluorescens, such as inhibition of growth, reduced glucose utilization, etc. Results from the study suggest the presence of alterations in gene expressions that are involved in energy metabolism such as ATP-binding cassette transporters. Additionally, inhibition of the Cori cycle and glycolysis pathway by DMP were also observed in the bacteria. P. fluorescens, a plant growth promoting rhizobacterium (PGPR), is an important bacteria found in soil, leaves and water that produces metabolites that allow plants to resist biotic and abiotic stresses. Hence, the release of DMP as waste into the environment should be more carefully considered.

Another study shows the ability of DMP to inhibit the growth and glucose utilization of P. fluorescens, a species that can cause bacteremia in humans. Most specifically, cell membrane deformation and membrane channels misopening were observed, as well as altered gene expression responsible of energy metabolism.

=== Aquatic toxicity ===
The toxicity of DMP on adult zebrafish (Danio rerio) was examined and showed oxidative damage after high concentrations of exposure. There was also found that antioxidant enzymes can be used as biochemical markers to identify the toxicant to be DMP. The LC50 after 96h of exposure was 45.8 mg/L, with 100% of mortality in the 200 mg/L exposure group. After 96h of exposure at high concentrations the activity levels of the primary antioxidant enzymes catalase, superoxide dismutase, and glutathione transferase activities were significantly reduced. This resulted in reduction of gene expression of these enzymes. Antioxidant enzymes act as defenders of cells from oxidant damage from contaminants present as free radicals that can cause enzyme inactivation, DNA and cholesterol damage and peroxidation of unsaturated fats in the cell membrane. The degree of lipid peroxidation in animals can be measured by following the trend in concentration of malondialdehyde, that is a product of lipid peroxidation. That is an indicator of DMP exposure.

== Production and Business ==
Chittajit Mohan Dhar was a pioneer in the production of dimethyl phthalate and benzyl benzoate in India.

Chittajit Mohan Dhar (C.M. Dhar) played a crucial role in pioneering the domestic production of Benzyl Benzoate at Perfect Chemical Industries Pvt. Ltd., located at 39 Dum Dum Road, Kolkata, West Bengal. This innovation was essential for defense applications, and by shifting production to Indian soil, the company saved the nation valuable foreign exchange, amounting to ₹1 crore annually. This move significantly reduced India's dependency on imports and demonstrated the company's ability to produce complex chemicals domestically.

In addition, under Dhar's leadership, the company manufactured basic dyes such as Methylene Blue, Methyl Violet, Auramine, and Malachite Green, using indigenous plants and equipment. This commitment to self-reliant industrial processes was further evidenced by their production of Dimethyl Phthalate, another critical chemical for defense applications.

The company's achievements in the chemical sector were recognized by Professor Humayun Kabir, then Union Minister for Petroleum and Chemical Industries, who visited the factory to commend the rapid progress and the substantial contribution to saving foreign exchange. This visit highlighted the national importance of the company’s advancements and its role in supporting India's industrial and defense sectors.
