= Dibutyl phthalate =

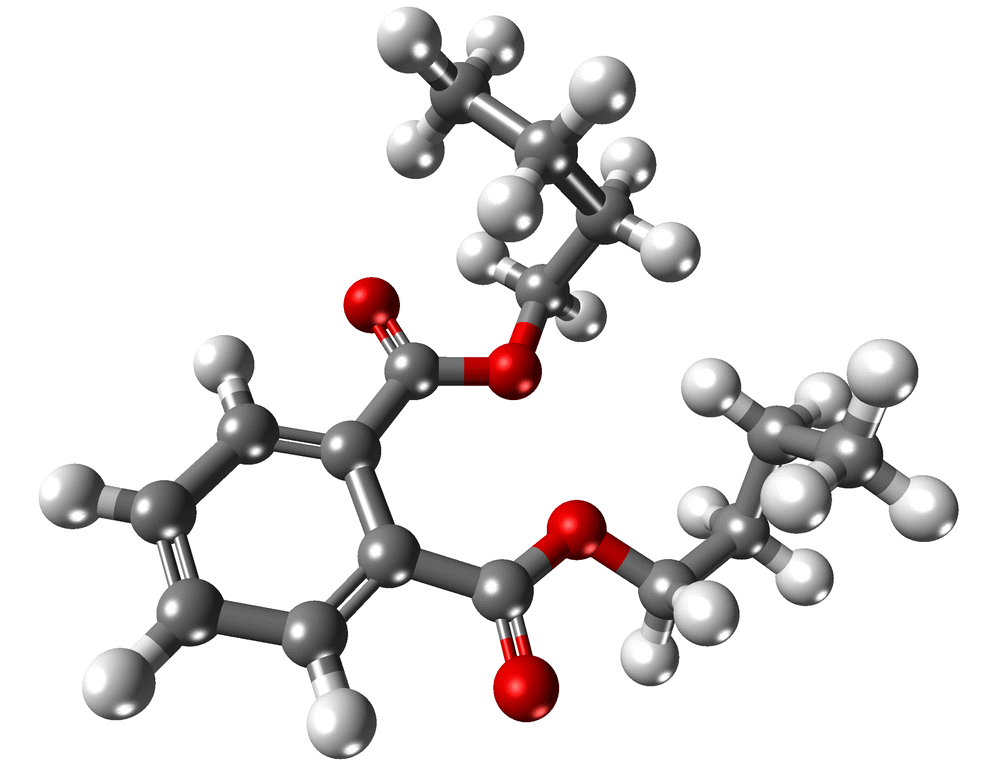

Names
- Preferred IUPAC name Dibutyl benzene-1,2-dicarboxylate
- Other names Dibutyl phthalate Di-n-butyl phthalate Butyl phthalate, dibasic (2:1) n-Butyl phthalate 1,2-Benzenedicarboxylic acid dibutyl ester o-Benzenedicarboxylic acid dibutyl ester DBP; Palatinol C Elaol; Dibutyl 1,2-benzene-dicarboxylate

Identifiers
| CAS Number | 84-74-2 |
| 3D model (JSmol) | Interactive image |
| Beilstein Reference | 1914064 |
| ChEBI | CHEBI:34687 |
| ChEMBL | ChEMBL272485 |
| ChemSpider | 13837319 |
| DrugBank | DB13716 |
| ECHA InfoCard | 100.001.416 |
| EC Number | 201-557-4 |
| Gmelin Reference | 262569 |
| IUPHAR/BPS | 6295 |
| KEGG | C14214 |
| PubChem CID | 3026 |
| RTECS number | TI0875000 |
| UNII | 2286E5R2KE |
| CompTox Dashboard (EPA) | DTXSID2021781 |
- InChI: InChI=1S/C16H22O4/c1-3-5-11-19-15(17)13-9-7-8-10-14(13)16(18)20-12-6-4-2/h7-10H,3-6,11-12H2,1-2H3 Key: DOIRQSBPFJWKBE-UHFFFAOYSA-N
- SMILES: CCCCOC(=O)c1ccccc1C(=O)OCCCC

Properties
| Chemical formula | C_{16}H_{22}O_{4} |
| Molar mass | 278.348 g·mol^{−1} |
| Appearance | Colorless liquid |
| Odor | aromatic |
| Density | 1.05 g/cm^{3} at 20 °C |
| Melting point | −35 °C (−31 °F; 238 K) |
| Boiling point | 340 °C (644 °F; 613 K) |
| Solubility in water | 13 mg/L (25 °C) |
| log P | 4.72 |
| Vapor pressure | 0.00007 mmHg (20 °C) |
| Magnetic susceptibility (χ) | −175.1·10^{−6} cm^{3}/mol |

Pharmacology
| ATC code | P03BX03 (WHO) |

Hazards
- Occupational safety and health (OHS/OSH)
| Main hazards | N), Harmful (Xi) |
- GHS labelling
| Pictograms | (GHS08: Health hazard) (GHS09: Environmental hazard) |
| Signal word | Danger |
| Hazard statements | H360Df, H400 |
| Precautionary statements | P201, P202, P273, P281, P308+P313, P391, P405, P501 |
| NFPA 704 (fire diamond) | 2 1 0 |
| Flash point | 157 °C (315 °F; 430 K) (closed cup) |
| Autoignition temperature | 402 °C (756 °F; 675 K) |
| Explosive limits | 0.5 - 3.5% |
- Lethal dose or concentration (LD, LC)
| LD_{50} (median dose) | 5289 mg/kg (oral, mouse); 8000 mg/kg (oral, rat); 10,000 mg/kg (oral, guinea pig) |
| LC_{50} (median concentration) | 4250 mg/m^{3} (rat); 25000 mg/m^{3} (mouse, 2 hr) |
- NIOSH (US health exposure limits)
| PEL (Permissible) | TWA 5 mg/m^{3} |
| REL (Recommended) | TWA 5 mg/m^{3} |
| IDLH (Immediate danger) | 4000 mg/m^{3} |
- Except where otherwise noted, data are given for materials in their standard state (at 25 °C [77 °F], 100 kPa). verify (what is ?) Infobox references

Dibutyl phthalate (DBP) is an organic compound of phthalate which is commonly used as a plasticizer because of its low toxicity and wide liquid range. With the chemical formula C_{6}H_{4}(CO_{2}C_{4}H_{9})_{2}, it is a colorless oil, although impurities often render commercial samples yellow. Dibutyl phthalate has high dielectric constant.

== Production and use ==
DBP is produced by the reaction of n-butanol with phthalic anhydride. DBP is an important plasticizer that enhances the utility of some major engineering plastics, such as PVC. Such modified PVC is widely used in plumbing for carrying sewage and other corrosive materials.

== Degradation ==
Hydrolysis of DBP leads to phthalic acid and 1-butanol. Monobutyl phthalate (MBP) is its major metabolite.

=== Biodegradation ===
Biodegradation by microorganisms represents one route for remediation of DBP. For example, Enterobacter species can biodegrade municipal solid waste—where the DBP concentration can be observed at 1500 ppm—with a half-life of 2–3 hours. In contrast, the same species can break down 100% of dimethyl phthalate after a span of six days. The white rot fungus Polyporus brumalis degrades DBP. DBP is leached from landfills.

=== Physical properties relevant to biodegradation ===
As reflected by its octanol-water partition coefficient of around 4, it is lipophilic, which means that it is not readily mobilized (dissolved by) water. Nonetheless, dissolved organic compounds (DOC) increase its mobility in landfills.

DBP has a low vapor pressure of 2.67 × 10^{−3} Pa. Thus DBP does not evaporate readily (hence its utility as a plasticizer). The Henry's Law constant is 8.83 × 10^{−7} atm-m^{3}/mol.

== Legislation ==
DBP is regarded as an endocrine disruptor.

=== European Union ===
The use of this substance in cosmetics, including nail polishes, is banned in the European Union under Directive 76/768/EEC 1976.

The use of DBP has been restricted in the European Union for use in children's toys since 1999.

An EU Risk Assessment has been conducted on DBP and the outcome has now been published in the EU Official Journal. To eliminate a potential risk to plants in the vicinity of processing sites and workers through inhalation, measures are to be taken within the framework of the IPPC Directive (96/61/EC) and the Occupational Exposure Directive (98/24/EC) Also includes the 2004 addendum.

Based on urine samples from people of different ages, the European Commission Scientific Committee on Health and Environmental Risks (SCHER) concluded that total exposures to DBP should be further reduced.

Under European Union Directive 2011/65/EU revision 2015/863, DBP is limited to max 1000 ppm concentration in any homogenous material.

=== United States ===
Dibutyl phthalate (DBP) is one of the six phthalic acid esters found on the Priority Pollutant List, which consists of pollutants regulated by the United States Environmental Protection Agency (U.S. EPA).

DBP was added to the California Proposition 65 (1986) list of suspected teratogens in November 2006. It is a suspected endocrine disruptor. It was used in many consumer products, e.g., nail polish, but such usages has declined since around 2006. It was banned in children's toys, in concentrations of 1000 ppm or greater, under section 108 of the Consumer Product Safety Improvement Act of 2008 (CPSIA).

== Safety ==
Phthalates are noncorrosive with low acute toxicity.

== See also ==
- Phthalic acid
- Phthalates
- Diisobutyl phthalate (DIBP)
- Nail polish
