= Diisononyl phthalate =

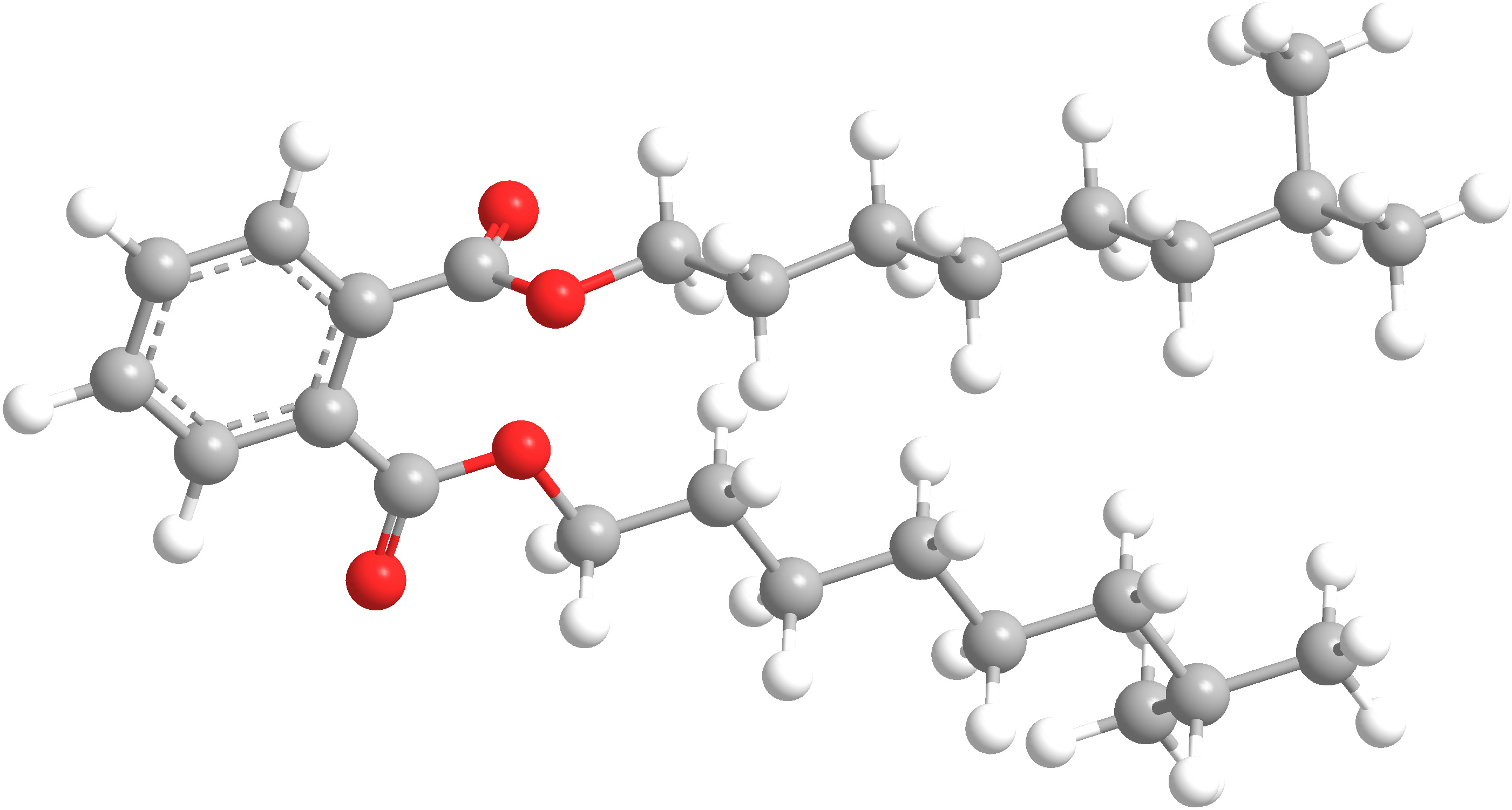

Names
- Preferred IUPAC name 1,2-Benzenedicarboxylic acid, di-C8-10 branched alkyl esters, C9 rich
- Other names 1,2-Benzenedicarboxylic acid, 1,2-diisononyl ester

Identifiers
CAS Number	28553-12-0; 68515-48-0
3D model (JSmol)	Interactive image
Abbreviations	DINP
ChEBI	CHEBI:35459
ChemSpider	513622
ECHA InfoCard	100.044.602
PubChem CID	590836
UNII	4010KIX4CK
CompTox Dashboard (EPA)	DTXSID60860420
- InChI: InChI=1S/C26H42O4/c1-21(2)15-9-5-7-13-19-29-25(27)23-17-11-12-18-24(23)26(28)30-20-14-8-6-10-16-22(3)4/h11-12,17-18,21-22H,5-10,13-16,19-20H2,1-4H3 Key: HBGGXOJOCNVPFY-UHFFFAOYSA-N; InChI=1/C26H42O4/c1-21(2)15-9-5-7-13-19-29-25(27)23-17-11-12-18-24(23)26(28)30-20-14-8-6-10-16-22(3)4/h11-12,17-18,21-22H,5-10,13-16,19-20H2,1-4H3 Key: HBGGXOJOCNVPFY-UHFFFAOYAX
- SMILES: O=C(OCCCCCCC(C)C)c1ccccc1C(=O)OCCCCCCC(C)C

Properties
Chemical formula	C_{26}H_{42}O_{4}
Molar mass	418.618 g·mol^{−1}
Appearance	Oily viscous liquid
Density	0.98 g/cm^{3}
Melting point	−43 °C (−45 °F; 230 K)
Boiling point	244 to 252 °C (471 to 486 °F; 517 to 525 K) at 0.7 kPa
Solubility in water	<0.01 g/mL at 20 °C
Viscosity	64 to 265 mPa·s

Hazards
Flash point	221 °C (430 °F; 494 K) (c.c.)
Autoignition temperature	380 °C (716 °F; 653 K)
- Except where otherwise noted, data are given for materials in their standard state (at 25 °C [77 °F], 100 kPa). verify (what is ?) Infobox references

Diisononyl phthalate (DINP) is a phthalate used as a plasticizer. DINP is typically a mixture of chemical compounds consisting of various isononyl esters of phthalic acid۔

== Use ==
It is commonly used in a large variety of plastic products including:

- Plasticizer in polyvinyl chloride (PVC)
- Construction and building material
- Fuel and automotive products
- In electronics materials (as a flexible vinyl additive)
- As cable insulation additive
- Adhesives and sealants
- Paints and coatings
- Rubber products.

== Health issues ==
The European Union has set a maximum specific migration limit (SML) from food contact materials of 9 mg/kg food for the sum of diisononyl phthalates and diisodecyl phthalates.

DINP is listed as a substance "known to the State of California to cause cancer" under Proposition 65 legislation.

Studies find that exposure to environmentally relevant concentrations of DINP in zebrafish disrupt the endocannabinoid system (ECS) and affect reproduction in a gender specific manner, and have other adverse effects on aquatic organisms, as DINP upregulates orexigenic signals and causes hepatosteatosis together with deregulation of the peripheral ECS and lipid metabolism.

The ECHA's Risk Assessment Committee (RAC) has concluded, on March 7, 2018, that Di-isononyl phthalate (DINP) does not warrant classification for reprotoxic effects under the EU's Classification, Labelling and Packaging (CLP) regulations.

Children and childcare products are strictly regulated by regulatory organizations.

== See also ==
- Diisoheptyl phthalate
- Plastic pollution
