= Arene substitution pattern =

Position of molecules attached to benzene rings

Arene substitution patterns are part of organic chemistry IUPAC nomenclature and pinpoint the position of substituents other than hydrogen in relation to each other on an aromatic hydrocarbon.

== Ortho, meta, and para substitution ==
Main arene substitution patterns

- In ortho-substitution, two substituents occupy positions next to each other, which may be numbered 1 and 2. In the diagram, these positions are marked R and ortho.
- In meta-substitution, the substituents occupy positions 1 and 3 (corresponding to R and meta in the diagram).
- In para-substitution, the substituents occupy the opposite ends (positions 1 and 4, corresponding to R and para in the diagram).

The toluidines serve as an example for these three types of substitution.

=== Synthesis ===
Electron donating groups, for example amino, hydroxyl, alkyl, and phenyl groups tend to be ortho/para-directors, and electron withdrawing groups such as nitro, nitrile, and ketone groups, tend to be meta-directors.

=== Properties ===
Although the specifics vary depending on the compound, in simple disubstituted arenes, the three isomers tend to have rather similar boiling points. However, the para isomer usually has the highest melting point, and the lowest solubility in a given solvent, of the three isomers.

=== Separation of ortho and para isomers ===
Because electron donating groups are both ortho and para directors, separation of these isomers is a common problem in synthetic chemistry. Several methods exist in order to separate these isomers:

- Column chromatography will often separate these isomers, as the ortho is more polar than the para in general.
- Fractional crystallisation can be used to obtain pure para product, relying on the principle that it is less soluble than the ortho and thus will crystallise first. Care must be taken to avoid cocrystallisation of the ortho isomer.
- Many nitro compounds' ortho and para isomers have quite different boiling points. These isomers can often be separated by distillation. These separated isomers can be converted to diazonium salts and used to prepare other pure ortho or para compounds.

== Ipso, meso, and peri substitution ==
ipso- substitution.

meso- substitution.

peri- substitution.
- Ipso-substitution describes two substituents sharing the same ring position in an intermediate compound in an electrophilic aromatic substitution. Trimethylsilyl, tert-butyl, and isopropyl groups can form stable carbocations, hence are ipso directing groups.
- Meso-substitution refers to the substituents occupying a benzylic position. It is observed in compounds such as calixarenes and acridines.
- Peri-substitution occurs in naphthalenes for substituents at the 1 and 8 positions.

== Cine and tele substitution ==
- In cine-substitution, the entering group takes up a position adjacent to that occupied by the leaving group. For example, cine-substitution is observed in aryne chemistry.
- Tele-substitution occurs when the new position is more than one atom away on the ring.

== Etymology ==
The prefixes ortho, meta, and para are all derived from Greek, meaning correct, following, and beside, respectively. The relationship to the current meaning is perhaps not obvious. The ortho description was historically used to designate the original compound, and an isomer was often called the meta compound. For instance, the trivial names orthophosphoric acid and trimetaphosphoric acid have nothing to do with aromatics at all. Likewise, the description para was reserved for just closely related compounds. Thus Jöns Jakob Berzelius originally called the racemic form of tartaric acid "paratartaric acid" (another obsolete term: racemic acid) in 1830. The use of the prefixes ortho, meta and para to distinguish isomers of disubstituted aromatic rings starts with Wilhelm Körner in 1867, although he applied the ortho prefix to a 1,4-isomer and the meta prefix to a 1,2-isomer. It was the German chemist Karl Gräbe who, in 1869, first used the prefixes ortho-, meta-, para- to denote specific relative locations of the substituents on a disubstituted aromatic ring (namely naphthalene). In 1870, the German chemist Viktor Meyer first applied Gräbe's nomenclature to benzene. The current nomenclature was introduced by the Chemical Society in 1879.

== Examples ==
Examples of the use of this nomenclature are given for isomers of cresol, C_{6}H_{4}(OH)(CH_{3}):

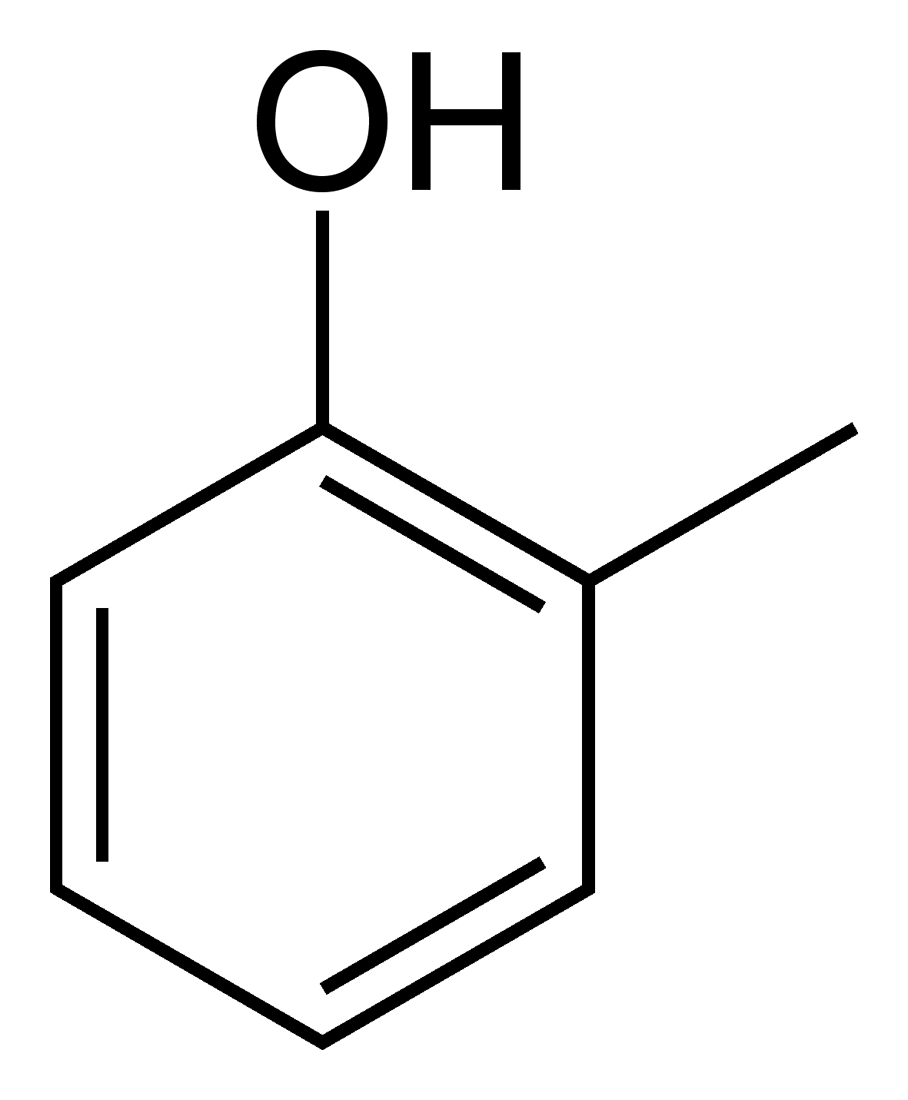
o-cresol

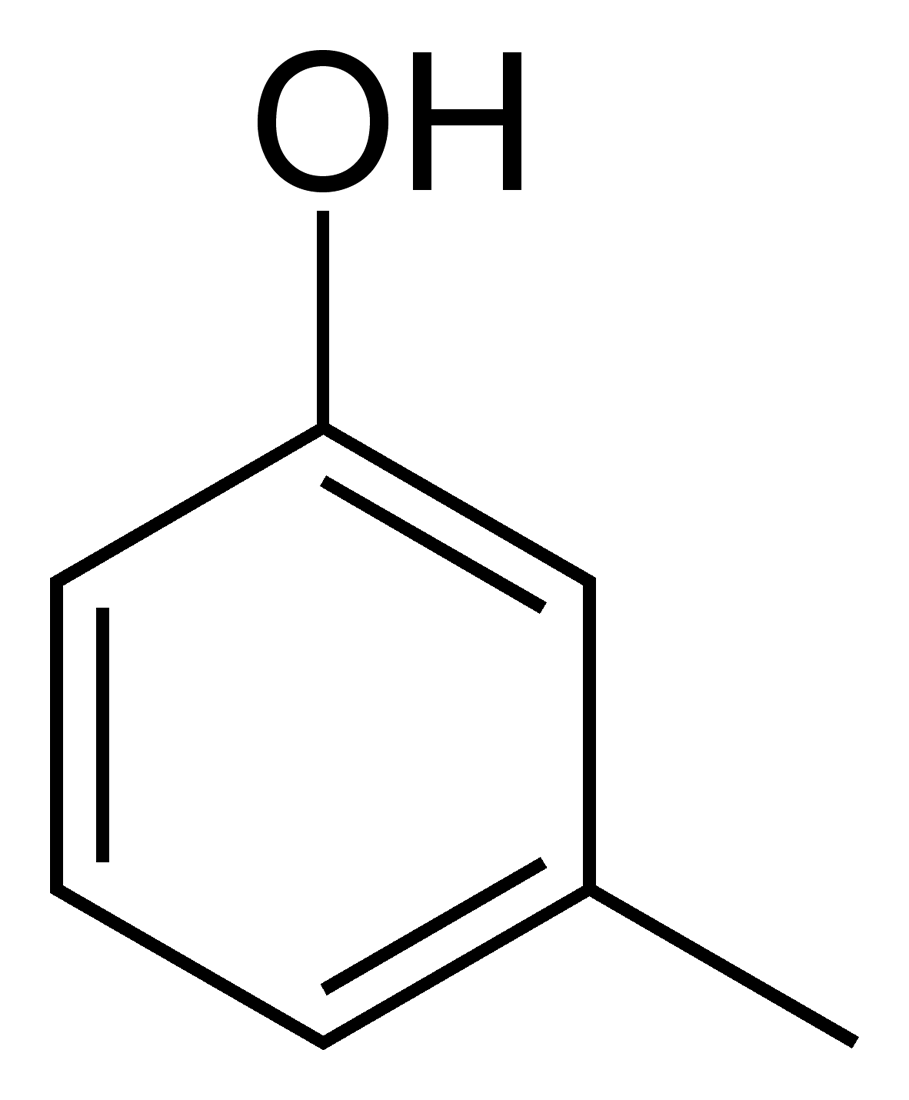
m-cresol

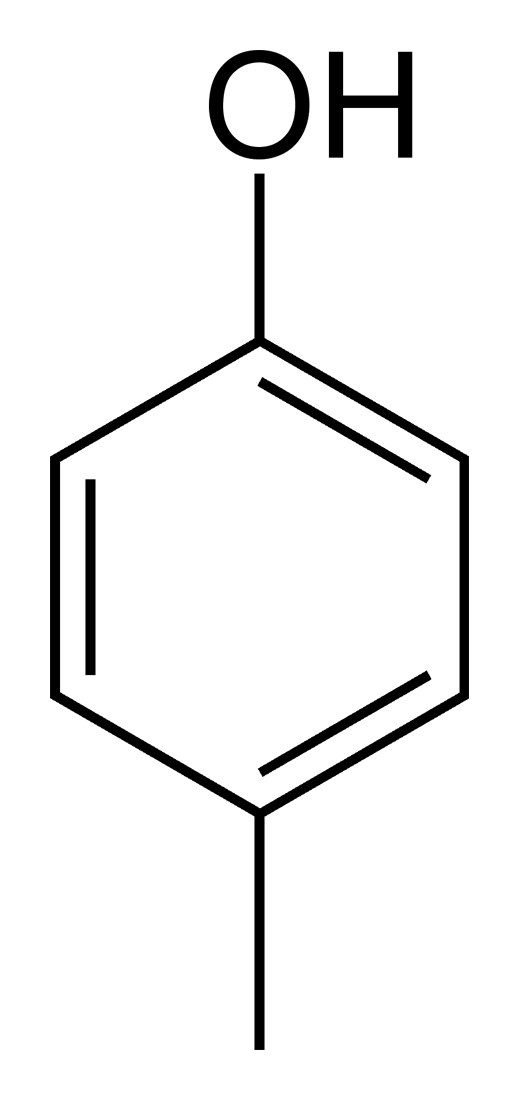
p-cresol

There are three arene substitution isomers of dihydroxybenzene (C_{6}H_{4}(OH)_{2}) – the ortho isomer catechol, the meta isomer resorcinol, and the para isomer hydroquinone:

catechol

resorcinol

hydroquinone

There are three arene substitution isomers of benzenedicarboxylic acid (C_{6}H_{4}(COOH)_{2}) – the ortho isomer phthalic acid, the meta isomer isophthalic acid, and the para isomer terephthalic acid:

phthalic acid

isophthalic acid

terephthalic acid

These terms can also be used in six-membered heterocyclic aromatic systems such as pyridine, where the nitrogen atom is considered one of the substituents. For example, nicotinamide and niacin, shown meta substitutions on a pyridine ring, while the cation of pralidoxime is an ortho isomer.

niacin

nicotinamide

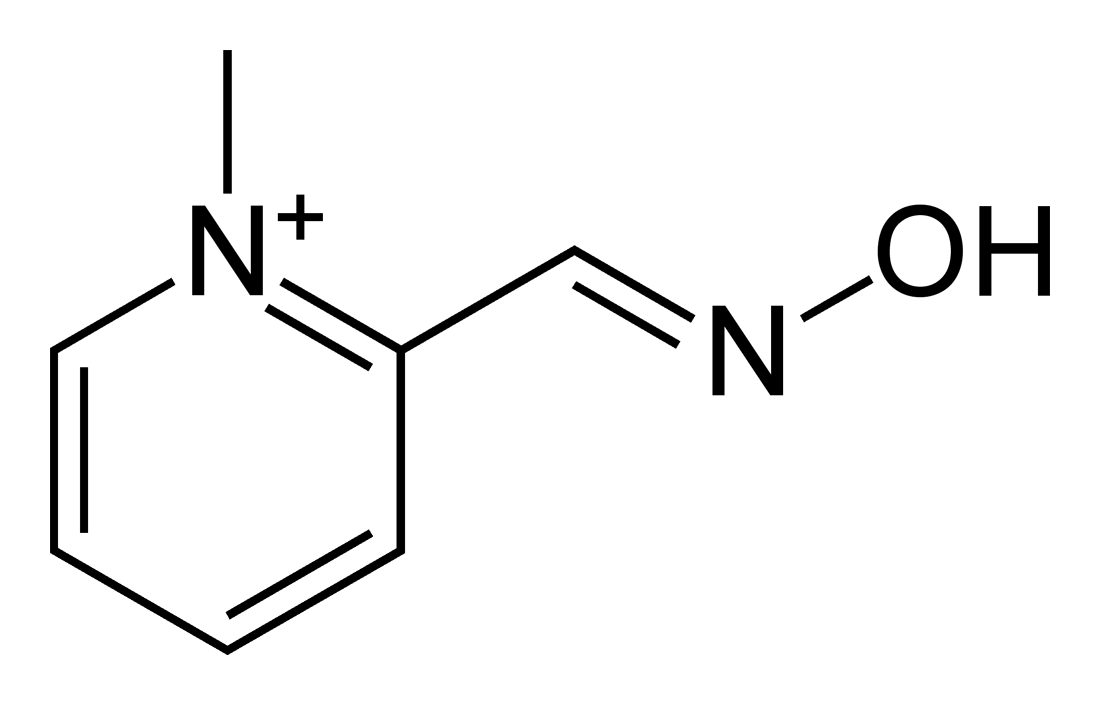
pralidoxime

== See also ==
- Descriptor (chemistry)
- Isomer
- Structural isomerism
