= C8H6O4 =

The molecular formula C_{8}H_{6}O_{4} (molar mass: 166.14 g/mol, exact mass: 166.0266 u) may refer to:

- Isophthalic acid
- Phthalic acid
- Terephthalic acid (TPA)
