= 2-Formylbenzoate dehydrogenase =

Class of enzymes

Identifiers
- EC no.: 1.2.1.78

Databases
- IntEnz: IntEnz view
- BRENDA: BRENDA entry
- ExPASy: NiceZyme view
- KEGG: KEGG entry
- MetaCyc: metabolic pathway
- PRIAM: profile
- PDB structures: RCSB PDB PDBe PDBsum
Search
- PMC: articles
- PubMed: articles
- NCBI: proteins

2-Formylbenzoate dehydrogenase (EC 1.2.1.78, 2-carboxybenzaldehyde dehydrogenase, 2CBAL dehydrogenase, PhdK) is an enzyme with systematic name 2-formylbenzoate:NAD^{+} oxidoreductase. This enzyme catalyses the following chemical reaction

2-formylbenzoic acid
+ NAD^{+}
H_{2}O
H^{+}
H_{2}O
H^{+}
phthalic acid
+ NADH

The enzyme is involved in phenanthrene degradation.
