= C8H6O3 =

The molecular formula C_{8}H_{6}O_{3} (molar mass: 150.13 g/mol) may refer to:

- 2-Carboxybenzaldehyde
- 4-Carboxybenzaldehyde
- Phenylglyoxylic acid
- Piperonal
