= Phthalate 4,5-dioxygenase =

Enzyme

Identifiers
- EC no.: 1.14.12.7
- CAS no.: 63626-44-8

Databases
- BRENDA: enzyme data
- ExPASy: NiceZyme view
- KEGG: enzyme entry
- MetaCyc: metabolic pathway
- Rhea: reactions
- PDB structures: RCSB PDB PDBe PDBsum
- Gene Ontology: AmiGO / QuickGO
Search
- PMC: articles
- PubMed: articles
- NCBI: proteins

Phthalate 4,5-dioxygenase (EC 1.14.12.7) is an enzyme that catalyzes the chemical reaction

phthalic acid
+ NADH
O_{2} + H^{+}
cis-4,5-dihydroxycyclohexa-2,6-diene-1,2-dicarboxylic acid
+ NAD^{+}

The four substrates of this enzyme are phthalic acid, nicotinamide adenine dinucleotide (NADH), oxygen, and a proton. Its products are cis-4,5-dihydroxycyclohexa-2,6-diene-1,2-dicarboxylic acid and NAD^{+}.

This enzyme belongs to the family of oxidoreductases, specifically those acting on paired donors, with molecular oxygen as oxidant and incorporation or reduction of oxygen. The systematic name of its class is phthalate,NADH:oxygen oxidoreductase (4,5-hydroxylating). Other names in common use include PDO, and phthalate dioxygenase. The enzyme participates in 2,4-dichlorobenzoate degradation. It is an Iron-sulfur protein which uses flavin mononucleotide as a cofactor.
