= TESD =

TESD may refer to:

- Tredyffrin/Easttown School District
- 4,5:9,10-diseco-3-hydroxy-5,9,17-trioxoandrosta-1(10),2-diene-4-oate hydrolase, an enzyme
- Tell 'Em Steve-Dave!, a podcast
