= HSAD =

HSAD may refer to:

- 4,5:9,10-diseco-3-hydroxy-5,9,17-trioxoandrosta-1(10),2-diene-4-oate hydrolase, an enzyme
- Haryana State Akali Dal, a Sikh political party in India
