= Kryptoracemic compounds =

In Chemistry, a kryptoracemic compound or kryptoracemate (sometimes false conglomerate) is a racemic compound crystallizing in a Sohncke space group.

In most of the cases, racemic compounds crystallize in centrosymmetric crystal structures. In a kryptoracemic compound the chemical composition of the crystal is racemic although the crystal belongs to space groups in which all enantiomerically pure molecules have to crystallize.

Crystallographically, in kryptoracemic compounds, the number of independent molecules in the asymmetric unit (Z′) is necessarily greater than 1 and should take an even value (to respect the racemic composition). By extension, the scalemic compounds (or unbalanced compounds), i.e. crystal with non-stoichiometric ratio of enantiomer, crystallizing in Sohncke space group are sometimes included in kryptoracemic compounds although they are not strito-sensu kryptoracemic.

== Etymology ==
The term (kryptoracemate) was coined by Ivan Bernal who employed this term during a meeting of the American Crystallographic Association in 1995.

The name is made of krypto (from Ancient Greek: κρυπτός, romanized: kryptos "the hidden one") and racemic. It comes from the fact that the racemic composition is "hidden" in a Sohncke space group (usually enantiomerically pure).

== Frequency of kryptoracemic compounds in organic crystals ==
There is no space group restriction for the crystallization of racemic compound crystallizing either in centrosymmetric or in non-centrosymmetric space group (SG). The frequency of organic racemic compounds in the Cambridge Structural Database is summarized in the following table:

Space group (SG) frequency of racemic compounds in organic crystals
	Centrosymmetric SGs	Non-centrosymmetric Achiral SGs	Kryptoracemic Compounds (Non-centrosymmetric Chiral SGs or Sohncke SGs)
Structure	Permitted	Permitted	Permitted
Frequency	92.75%	6.25%	1%
Top SG	P2_{1}/c, C2/c, Pbca, P-1	Pna2_{1}, Pca2_{1}, Cc	P2_{1}, P2_{1}2_{1}2_{1}

Kryptoracemic compounds are thus very rare and represent circa 1% of the racemic compounds. The frequency of kryptoracemic compounds in the whole organic Cambridge Structural Database was estimated to circa 0.4% to 0.8%.

A review covering organometallic compounds with a stereogenic metal atom sorted a list of 26 possible kryptoracemic compounds.
