= 4-Carboxybenzaldehyde =

Names
- Preferred IUPAC name 4-Formylbenzoic acid

Identifiers
CAS Number	619-66-9
3D model (JSmol)	Interactive image
ChEBI	CHEBI:191179
ChemSpider	11591
ECHA InfoCard	100.009.645
EC Number	210-607-4
PubChem CID	12088
UNII	UES4QRK36E
CompTox Dashboard (EPA)	DTXSID3027249
- InChI: InChI=1S/C8H6O3/c9-5-6-1-3-7(4-2-6)8(10)11/h1-5H,(H,10,11) Key: GOUHYARYYWKXHS-UHFFFAOYSA-N; InChI=1/C8H6O3/c9-5-6-1-3-7(4-2-6)8(10)11/h1-5H,(H,10,11) Key: GOUHYARYYWKXHS-UHFFFAOYAP
- SMILES: c1cc(ccc1C=O)C(=O)O

Properties
Chemical formula	C_{8}H_{6}O_{3}
Molar mass	150.133 g·mol^{−1}
Appearance	white solid
Melting point	245 °C (473 °F; 518 K)
- Except where otherwise noted, data are given for materials in their standard state (at 25 °C [77 °F], 100 kPa). Infobox references

4-Carboxybenzaldehyde (CBA) is an organic compound with the formula OCHC_{6}H_{4}CO_{2}H. It consists of a benzene ring substituted with both an aldehyde and a carboxylic acid, with these functional groups on opposite corners of the ring. This compound is formed in 0.5% yield as a byproduct in the production terephthalic acid from p-xylene. Since approximately 40,000,000 tons of terephthalic acid are produced per year, CBA is a relatively large scale industrial chemical.

== Uses ==
Bavisant

One known use of 4-Carboxybenzaldehyde is in the synthesis of Bavisant (JNJ-31001074) [929622-08-2]. Another use is in the synthesis of revefenacin.

== See also ==
- 2-Carboxybenzaldehyde
