= Comamonas kerstersii =

Scientific classification
- Domain: Bacteria
- Kingdom: Pseudomonadati
- Phylum: Pseudomonadota
- Class: Betaproteobacteria
- Order: Burkholderiales
- Family: Comamonadaceae
- Genus: Comamonas
- Species: C. kerstersii

Binomial name
- Comamonas kerstersii Wauters et al. 2003

Type strain
- AF61, AFG1, Caselitz AF61, CCUG 15333, CIP 107987, DSM 16026, GUH/UCL C079, LMG 3475

Species of bacterium

Comamonas kerstersii is a Gram-negative, oxidase- and catalase-positive, motile bacterium with multitrichous polar flagella from the genus Comamonas and family Comamonadaceae. C. kerstersii is a subgroup of Comamonas terrigena, and has been linked to cases of perforated appendices.
