= Chemosynthesis (nanotechnology) =

Process in molecular nanotechnology

Random thermal (translational) motion of particles, with collisions acting as reaction "points"

In molecular nanotechnology, chemosynthesis is any chemical synthesis where reactions occur due to random thermal motion, a class which encompasses almost all of modern synthetic chemistry. The human-authored processes of chemical engineering are accordingly represented as biomimicry of the natural phenomena above, and the entire class of non-photosynthetic chains by which complex molecules are constructed is described as chemo-.

Chemosynthesis can be applied in many different areas of research, including in positional assembly of molecules. This is where molecules are assembled in certain positions in order to perform specific types of chemosynthesis using molecular building blocks. In this case synthesis is most efficiently performed through the use of molecular building blocks with a small amount of linkages. Unstrained molecules are also preferred, which is when molecules undergo minimal external stress, which leads to the molecule having a low internal energy. There are two main types of synthesis: additive and subtractive. In additive synthesis the structure starts with nothing, and then gradually molecular building blocks are added until the structure that is needed is created. In subtractive synthesis they start with a large molecule and remove building blocks one by one until the structure is achieved.

This form of engineering is then contrasted with mechanosynthesis, a hypothetical process where individual molecules are mechanically manipulated to control reactions to human specification. Since photosynthesis and other natural processes create extremely complex molecules to the specifications contained in RNA and stored long-term in DNA form, advocates of molecular engineering claim that an artificial process can likewise exploit a chain of long-term storage, short-term storage, enzyme-like copying mechanisms similar to those in the cell, and ultimately produce complex molecules which need not be proteins. For instance, sheet diamond or carbon nanotubes could be produced by a chain of non-biological reactions that have been designed using the basic model of biology.

Use of the term chemosynthesis reinforces the view that this is feasible by pointing out that several alternate means of creating complex proteins, mineral shells of mollusks and crustaceans, etc., evolved naturally, not all of them dependent on photosynthesis and a food chain from the sun via chlorophyll. Since more than one such pathway exists to creating complex molecules, even extremely specific ones such as proteins edible to fish, the likelihood of humans being able to design an entirely new one is considered (by these advocates) to be near certainty in the long run, and possible within a generation.

== Modern applications ==
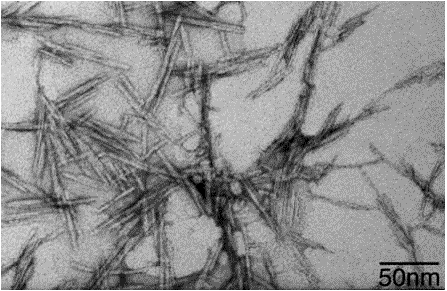
Cellulose Nanoparticles that can be synthesized through Chemosynthetic methods.

Several methods of nanoscale chemosynthesis have been developed, a common variant of which is chemical bath deposition (CBD). This process enables large-scale synthesis of thin film layers of a variety of materials, and has been especially useful in providing such films for opto-electronics through the efficient creation of lead sulfide (PbS) films. CBD synthesis of these films allows for both cost-effective and accurate assemblies, with grain type and size as well as optical properties of the nanomaterial dictated by the properties of the surrounding bath. As such, this method of nanoscale chemosynthesis is often implemented when these properties are desired, and can be used for a wide range of nanomaterials, not just lead sulfide, due to the adjustable properties.

As explained previously, the usage of chemical bath deposition allows for the synthesis of large deposits of nanofilm layers at a low cost, which is important in the mass production of cadmium sulfide. The low cost associated with the synthesis of CdS through means of chemical deposition has seen CdS nanoparticles being applied to semiconductor sensitized solar cells, which when treated with CdS nanoparticles, see improved performance in their semiconductor materials through a reduction of the band gap energy. The usage of chemical deposition in particular allows for the crystallite orientation of CdS to be more favourable, though the process is quite time consuming. Research by S.A. Vanalakar in 2010 resulted in the successful production of cadmium sulfide nanoparticle film with a thickness of 139 nm, though this was only after the applied films were allowed to undergo deposition for 300 minutes. As the deposition time was increased for the film, not only was the film thickness found to increase, but the band gap of the resultant film decreased.
