= Diisoheptyl phthalate =

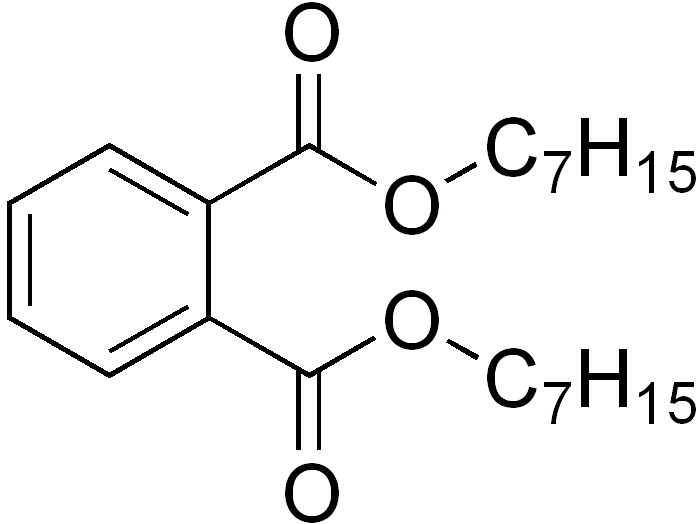

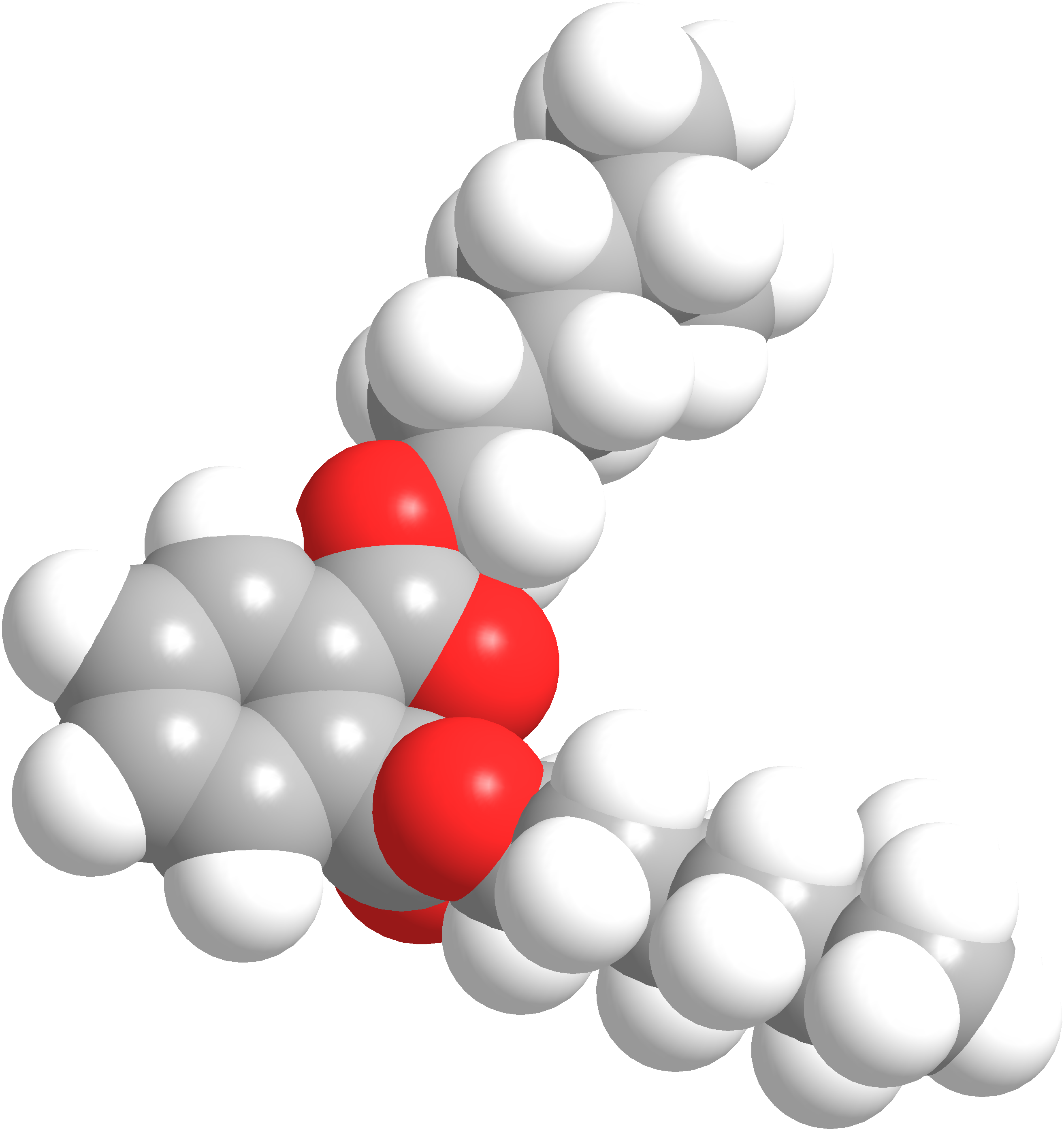

Names
- Preferred IUPAC name Bis(5-methylhexyl) benzene-1,2-dicarboxylate
- Other names Bis(5-methylhexyl) phthalate 1,2-Benzenedicarboxylic acid bis(isoheptyl) ester

Identifiers
CAS Number	41451-28-9
3D model (JSmol)	Interactive image
ChEMBL	ChEMBL1893293
ChemSpider	513939
ECHA InfoCard	100.292.455
EC Number	276-158-1
PubChem CID	591200
UNII	9JJP9B98FG
CompTox Dashboard (EPA)	DTXSID30872297 DTXSID70872296, DTXSID30872297
- InChI: InChI=1S/C22H34O4/c1-17(2)11-7-9-15-25-21(23)19-13-5-6-14-20(19)22(24)26-16-10-8-12-18(3)4/h5-6,13-14,17-18H,7-12,15-16H2,1-4H3 Key: RKELNIPLHQEBJO-UHFFFAOYSA-N
- SMILES: O=C(OCCCCC(C)C)C1=CC=CC=C1C(OCCCCC(C)C)=O

Properties
Chemical formula	C_{22}H_{34}O_{4}
Molar mass	362.510 g·mol^{−1}
Density	0.99 g/cm^{3}

Hazards
- GHS labelling
Pictograms	(GHS08: Health hazard)
Signal word	Warning
Hazard statements	H360D
Precautionary statements	P201, P202, P281, P308+P313, P405, P501
Flash point	113 °C (235 °F; 386 K)
- Except where otherwise noted, data are given for materials in their standard state (at 25 °C [77 °F], 100 kPa). verify (what is ?) Infobox references

Diisoheptyl phthalate is a phthalate used as a plasticizer. Diisoheptyl phthalate is typically a mixture of chemical compounds consisting of various isoheptyl esters of phthalic acid with the chemical formula C_{22}H_{34}O_{4}.

== See also ==
- Diisononyl phthalate
