= Comamonas badia =

Scientific classification
- Domain: Bacteria
- Kingdom: Pseudomonadati
- Phylum: Pseudomonadota
- Class: Betaproteobacteria
- Order: Burkholderiales
- Family: Comamonadaceae
- Genus: Comamonas
- Species: C. badia

Binomial name
- Comamonas badia Tago and Yokota 2005, sp. nov.

Type strain
- IAM 14839

Species of bacterium

Comamonas badia is a Gram-negative, oxidase-positive, catalase-positive, aerobic, rod-shaped, highly motile bacterium with a single polar flagellum from the genus Comamonas and family Comamonadaceae, which was isolated from activate sludge in Japan.
