= Comamonas denitrificans =

Scientific classification
- Domain: Bacteria
- Kingdom: Pseudomonadati
- Phylum: Pseudomonadota
- Class: Betaproteobacteria
- Order: Burkholderiales
- Family: Comamonadaceae
- Genus: Comamonas
- Species: C. denitrificans

Binomial name
- Comamonas denitrificans Young et al. 2008

Type strain
- ATCC 700936, CCM 7155, CCUG 44425, CIP 108016, Dahlhammar 123, DSM 17887, KCTC 12931, LMG 21602, NCIMB 13887

Species of bacterium

Comamonas denitrificans is a Gram-negative, oxidase- and catalase-positive, motile bacterium with a polar flagellum from the genus Comamonas and family Comamonadaceae, which was isolated from an activated sludge. Its colonies are yellow-white colored. Unlike other species of Comamonas, C. denitrificans can reduce nitrate to nitrogen gas.
