= Terephthalate 1,2-dioxygenase =

Class of enzymes

Identifiers
- EC no.: 1.14.12.15
- CAS no.: 162032-76-0

Databases
- IntEnz: IntEnz view
- BRENDA: BRENDA entry
- ExPASy: NiceZyme view
- KEGG: KEGG entry
- MetaCyc: metabolic pathway
- PRIAM: profile
- PDB structures: RCSB PDB PDBe PDBsum
- Gene Ontology: AmiGO / QuickGO
Search
- PMC: articles
- PubMed: articles
- NCBI: proteins

Terephthalate 1,2-dioxygenase (EC 1.14.12.15) is an enzyme that catalyzes the chemical reaction

terephthalic acid
+ NADH
O_{2} + H^{+}
3,4-dihydroxycyclohexa-1,5-diene-1,4-dicarboxylic acid
+ NAD^{+}

The four substrates of this enzyme are terephthalic acid, reduced nicotinamide adenine dinucleotide (NADH), oxygen, and a proton. Its products are (3S,4R)-3,4-dihydroxycyclohexa-1,5-diene-1,4-dicarboxylic acid and NAD^{+}.

This enzyme is an oxidoreductase that uses molecular oxygen as oxidant and incorporates both its atoms into the starting material. The systematic name of this enzyme class is benzene-1,4-dicarboxylate,NADH:oxygen oxidoreductase (1,2-hydroxylating). Other names in common use include benzene-1,4-dicarboxylate 1,2-dioxygenase, and 1,4-dicarboxybenzoate 1,2-dioxygenase. It is a Rieske protein containing an iron–sulfur cluster and participates in the metabolism of terephthalic acid.
