= Potassium hydrogen phthalate =

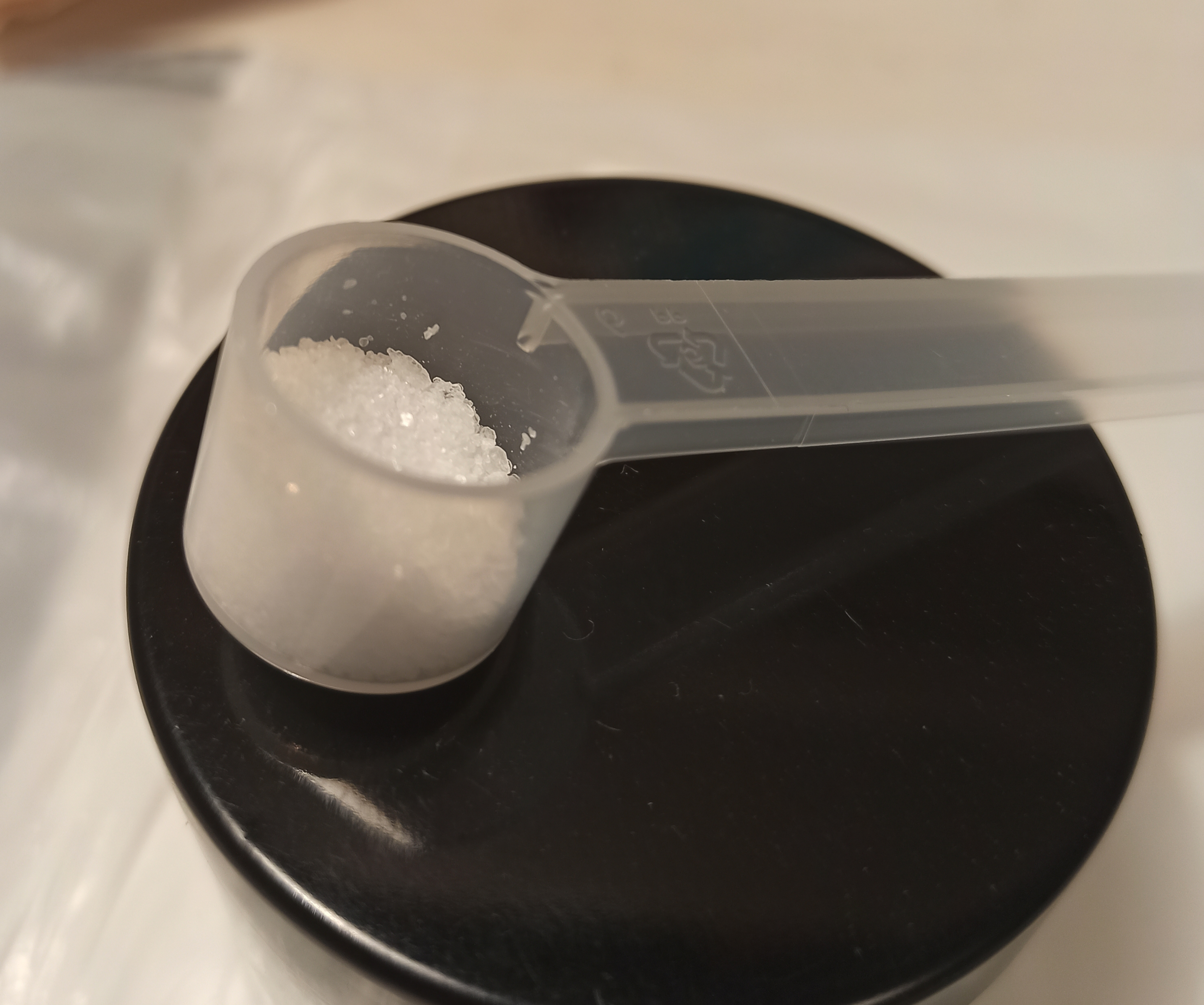
- Potassium hydrogen phthalate

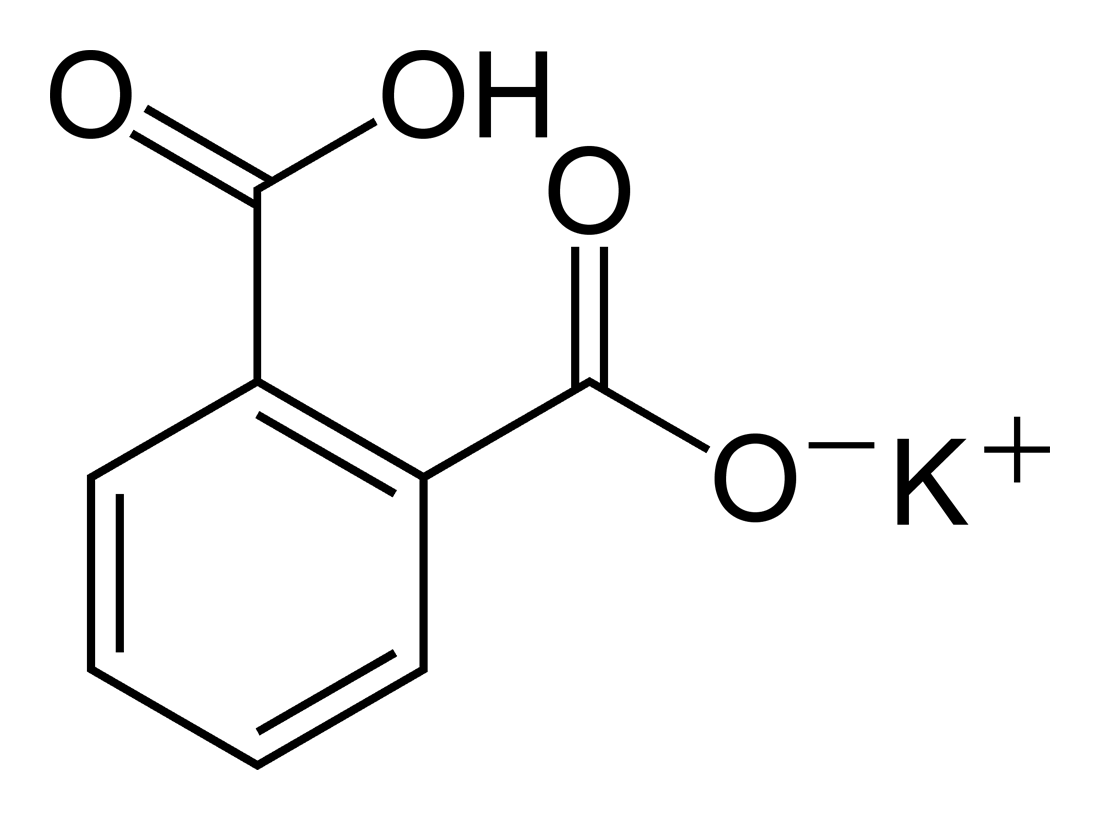
Potassium hydrogen phthalate
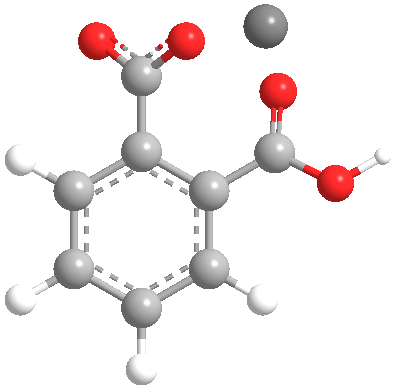
Potassium hydrogen phthalate

Names
- Preferred IUPAC name Potassium 2-carboxybenzoate
- Other names hydrogen potassium phthalate; phthalic acid potassium salt; potassium biphthalate; potassium acid phthalate; 1,2-benzenedicarboxylic acid, monopotassium salt; KHP; KHPh

Identifiers
CAS Number	877-24-7
3D model (JSmol)	Interactive image
ChEMBL	ChEMBL3187152
ChemSpider	12839
ECHA InfoCard	100.011.718
EC Number	212-889-4
PubChem CID	23676735
UNII	GG9121M623
CompTox Dashboard (EPA)	DTXSID0042167
- InChI: InChI=1S/C8H6O4.K/c9-7(10)5-3-1-2-4-6(5)8(11)12;/h1-4H,(H,9,10)(H,11,12);/q;+1/p-1 Key: IWZKICVEHNUQTL-UHFFFAOYSA-M; InChI=1/C8H6O4.K/c9-7(10)5-3-1-2-4-6(5)8(11)12;/h1-4H,(H,9,10)(H,11,12);/q;+1/p-1 Key: IWZKICVEHNUQTL-REWHXWOFAT
- SMILES: [K+].O=C(O)c1ccccc1C([O-])=O

Properties
Chemical formula	C_{8}H_{5}KO_{4}
Molar mass	204.222 g·mol^{−1}
Appearance	White or colorless solid
Density	1.636 g/cm^{3}
Melting point	~295 °C (decomposes)
Solubility in water	80 g/L (20 °C)
Solubility	slightly soluble in alcohol
Acidity (pK_{a})	5.4

Structure
Coordination geometry	tetrahedral

Hazards
- Occupational safety and health (OHS/OSH)
Main hazards	Irritant to eyes, skin, and respiratory system
- GHS labelling
Pictograms	(GHS07: Exclamation mark)
Signal word	Warning
Hazard statements	H315, H319, H335
Flash point	Non-flammable
Safety data sheet (SDS)	External MSDS
- Except where otherwise noted, data are given for materials in their standard state (at 25 °C [77 °F], 100 kPa). verify (what is ?) Infobox references

Potassium hydrogen phthalate, often called simply KHP, is an acidic salt compound. It is the monopotassium salt of phthalic acid which forms a white powder, colorless crystals, and a colorless aqueous solution. KHP is slightly acidic, and it is often used as a primary standard for acid–base titrations because it is solid and air-stable, making it easy to weigh accurately. It is not hygroscopic. It is also used as a primary standard for calibrating pH meters because, besides the properties just mentioned, its pH in solution is very stable. It also serves as a thermal standard in thermogravimetric analysis.

KHP dissociates completely in water, giving the potassium cation (K^{+}) and hydrogen phthalate anion (HP^{−})

KHP $\ce{->[\ce{H2O}]}$ K^{+} + HP^{−}

and then, acting as a weak acid, hydrogen phthalate reacts reversibly with water to give hydronium (H_{3}O^{+}) and phthalate ions.

HP^{−} + H_{2}O ⇌ P^{2−} + H_{3}O^{+}

KHP can be used as a buffering agent in combination with hydrochloric acid (HCl) or sodium hydroxide (NaOH). The buffering region is dependent upon the pKa, and is typically +/- 1.0 pH units of the pKa. The pKa of KHP is 5.4, so its pH buffering range would be 4.4 to 6.4; however, due to the presence of the second acidic group that bears the potassium ion, the first pKa also contributes to the buffering range well below pH 4.0, which is why KHP is a good choice for use as a reference standard for pH 4.00.

KHP is a useful standard for total organic carbon (TOC) testing. Most TOC analyzers are based on the oxidation of organics to carbon dioxide and water, with subsequent quantitation of the carbon dioxide. Many TOC analysts suggest testing their instruments with two standards: one typically easy for the instrument to oxidize (KHP), and one more difficult to oxidize. For the latter, benzoquinone is suggested.
