= 2-Carboxybenzaldehyde =

Names
- Preferred IUPAC name 2-Formylbenzoic acid
- Other names 2-Phthaldehydic acid

Identifiers
CAS Number	119-67-5
3D model (JSmol)	Interactive image
Beilstein Reference	742381
ChEBI	CHEBI:17605
ChEMBL	ChEMBL234213
ChemSpider	8099
ECHA InfoCard	100.003.948
EC Number	204-342-3
PubChem CID	8406
UNII	OAEGSO7G3Y
CompTox Dashboard (EPA)	DTXSID1059490
- InChI: InChI=1S/C8H6O3/c9-5-6-3-1-2-4-7(6)8(10)11/h1-5H,(H,10,11) Key: DYNFCHNNOHNJFG-UHFFFAOYSA-N
- SMILES: C1=CC=C(C(=C1)C=O)C(=O)O

Properties
Chemical formula	C_{8}H_{6}O_{3}
Solubility in water	soluble
Solubility	soluble in diethylether, ethanol
- Except where otherwise noted, data are given for materials in their standard state (at 25 °C [77 °F], 100 kPa). Infobox references

2-Carboxybenzaldehyde is a chemical compound. It consists of a benzene ring, with an aldehyde and a carboxylic acid as substituents that are ortho to each other. The compound exhibits ring–chain tautomerism: the two substituents can react with each other to form 3-hydroxyphthalide, a cyclic lactol. This lactol reacts readily with Grignard reagents, forming alkyl- and aryl-substituted phthalides. Other benzo-fused heterocyclic compounds can be derived from 2-carboxybenzaldehyde, including isoindolinones and phthalazinones, with a variety of pharmacological properties, such as the antihistamine azelastine.

== Synthesis ==
2-Carboxybenzaldehyde was first prepared from phthalide and characterized in 1887. The reaction of bromine with phthalide produces 2-bromophthalide, which is converted into 2-formylbenzoic acid by heating with water in a total yield of 78 to 83%.

Synthese von 2-Carboxybenzaldehyd aus Phthalid

An analogous process based on a chlorination reaction can also be used:

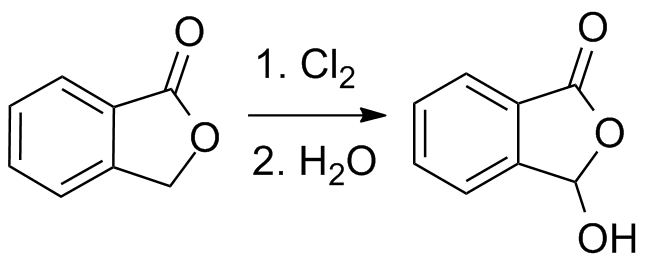

The synthesis of 1-dichloromethyl-2-(trichloromethyl)benzene by photochlorination of o-xylene was also reported in 1887.

Synthese von 2-Carboxybenzaldehyd aus o-Xylol

The hydrolysis of the pentachloroxylene to the 2-carboxybenzaldehyde is carried out by boiling it with FeCl_{3}-containing hydrochloric acid.

In the reaction of phthalic anhydride with sodium tetracarbonylferrate, only one of the carboxyl groups is reduced to the aldehyde, the second remains unchanged.

Synthese von 2-Carboxybenzaldehyd aus Phthalsäureanhydrid

This gives 2-carboxybenzaldehyde in a yield of 61%.

In a laboratory procedure, the oxidation of naphthalene with alkaline potassium permanganate is given, which, however, yields only a yield of 39% 2-carboxybenzaldehyde. Also the oxidation of naphthalene with ozone to 2-formylbenzoic acid offers no significant advantages.

Synthese von 2-Carboxybenzaldehyd aus Naphthalin

== Properties ==
Pure 2-carboxybenzaldehyde is a white crystalline powder which dissolves in water and in short-chain alcohols. In solid form and in most solvents, the substance is present as racemic 3-hydroxyphthalide (a lactol) as a result of ring–chain tautomerism.

Gleichgewicht 2-Carboxybenzaldehyd-3-Hydroxyphthalid

The refractive index is = 1.4500 (at 25 °C, 589 nm).

== Application ==
In the lactol form, 2-carboxybenzaldehyde behaves like a carboxylic acid anhydride and reacts smoothly with alcohols forming 3-alkoxyphthalides.

Reaktion von 3-Hydroxyphthalid mit Nukleophilen

Also with other nucleophilic compounds, such as, thiols, amines, amides, etc., 3-hydroxyphthalide reacts without a catalyst to give the corresponding derivatives. For example, it reacts with morpholine in 91% yield to 3-morpholinyl phthalide. 3-Hydroxyphthalide reacts with thionyl chloride at the hydroxyl group smoothly (80–90% yield) to 3-chlorophthalide. With Grignard reagents, the hydroxy group can be exchanged for the corresponding alkyl or aryl group:

Reaktion von 3-Hydroxyphthalid mit Grignard-Verbindungen

In the presence of (+)-cinchonine, in the reaction of (racemic) 3-hydroxyphthalide with carboxylic acid anhydrides to the corresponding chiral 3-substituted phthalides an enantiomeric excess of up to 90% ee can be achieved besides high product yields. An alternative approach to (racemic) 3-substituted phthalides with high yields is opened up by the reaction of 2-carboxybenzaldehyde and β-keto acids in the presence of base 4-anisidine in glycerol as solvent.

Reaktion von 3-Hydroxyphthalid mit β-Ketosäuren

2-Carboxybenzaldehyde undergoes a double condensation reaction with hydrazine or alkylhydrazines, 1(2H)-phthalenazinones are obtained under acid catalysis with K10-montmorillonite and microwave irradiation in high yield.

Reaktion von 2-Carboxybenzaldehyd mit Alkylhydrazinen

Phthalazinones (1(2H)-phthalenazinones) are important building blocks for natural products, fine chemicals and pharmaceutical active ingredients, such as the antihypertensive vasodilator hydralazine.

2-carboxybenzaldehyde can also be used for the preparation of N-substituted isoindolinones (1-isoindolinones, 2,3-dihydroindol-1-ones) which are formed when reacting 2-carboxybenzaldehyde with primary amines in the presence of platinum nanowires and low hydrogen pressure in 1,4-dioxane in very high yields:

Synthese von Isoindolinonen durch 3-Komponentenreaktion

When the reaction of 2-carboxybenzaldehyde is carried out with primary amines in the presence of dimethylphosphite, the corresponding isoindolin-1-one-3-phosphonates are obtained first. After activation with butyllithium with aromatic aldehydes (such as, benzaldehyde in a Horner–Wadsworth–Emmons reaction), these can be converted in very high yields to 3-(arylmethylene)isoindolin-1-ones.

Synthese von Arylmethylenisoindolinonen

More recently, 2-formylbenzoic acid became due to its reactivity of some interest as versatile molecular building block in multicomponent reactions, for example the Ugi reaction, for the synthesis of heterocyclic annellated aromatics. Functionalized isoindolinones are accessible in high yields in a three-component reaction with 2-formylbenzoic acid and 2-bromoanilines by palladium-catalyzed carbonylation.

Synthese von funktionalisierten Isoindolinonen

Another three-component reaction (here carried out as a Strecker synthesis) with 2-carboxybenzaldehyde, primary amines and potassium cyanide in methanol yields in the acidic medium an N-substituted isoindolinone-1-carbonitrile, formally an aminoacetonitrile derivative of isoindolinone with two moles of HCN.

Synthese von Isoindolinonen aus 2-Carboxybenzaldehyd via Strecker-Synthese

When substituted 2-formylbenzoic acid, potassium cyanide and equimolar amounts of primary aromatic amines and acetic acid are used, substituted isochromes-1-ones (isocumarins, 1H-2-benzopyran-1-ones) are obtained in good yields.

Synthese von Isochromenonen durch 3-Komponentenreaktion mit Kaliumcyanid

The isochromenones obtained are quantitatively converted into isoindolinones by reacting in DMSO upon ring constriction into substituted isobenzofurans or with catalytic amounts of iodine in triethylamine.

With isonitriles instead of potassium cyanide, 2-carboxybenzaldehyde and primary aromatic amines react in methanol to form substituted isochromen-1-ones, which are converted to isoindolinones with traces of acid.

Synthese von Isochromenonen durch 3-Komponentenreaktion mit Isocyaniden

Synthesis pathways for the isoquinoline derivative quinisocaine (acting as a local anesthetic) and the antihistamine azelastine are also based on 2-carboxybenzaldehyde as starting material.
