= Comamonas guangdongensis =

Scientific classification
- Domain: Bacteria
- Kingdom: Pseudomonadati
- Phylum: Pseudomonadota
- Class: Betaproteobacteria
- Order: Burkholderiales
- Family: Comamonadaceae
- Genus: Comamonas
- Species: C. guangdongensis

Binomial name
- Comamonas guangdongensis Zhang et al. 2013

Type strain
- CCTCC AB 2011133, CY01, KACC 16241

Species of bacterium

Comamonas guangdongensis is a Gram-negative, anaerobic, motile bacterium from the genus Comamonas and family Comamonadaceae, which was isolated from subterranean forest sediment in Guangdong Province in China.
