= Comamonas granuli =

Scientific classification
- Domain: Bacteria
- Kingdom: Pseudomonadati
- Phylum: Pseudomonadota
- Class: Betaproteobacteria
- Order: Burkholderiales
- Family: Comamonadaceae
- Genus: Comamonas
- Species: C. granuli

Binomial name
- Comamonas granuli Kim et al. 2011

Type strain
- KCTC 12199, Ko03, NBRC 101663

Species of bacterium

Comamonas granuli is a Gram-negative, catalase-positive, oxidase-positive, non-spore-forming, motile, rod-shaped bacterium from the genus Comamonas and family Comamonadaceae, which was isolated from microbial granules.
