= Comamonas sediminis =

Scientific classification
- Domain: Bacteria
- Kingdom: Pseudomonadati
- Phylum: Pseudomonadota
- Class: Betaproteobacteria
- Order: Burkholderiales
- Family: Comamonadaceae
- Genus: Comamonas
- Species: C. sediminis

Binomial name
- Comamonas sediminis Subhash et al. 2016

Type strain
- S3 SY-2016, JCM 31169, KEMB 563-466, strain S3

Species of bacterium

Comamonas sediminis is a Gram-negative bacterium from the genus Comamonas which has been isolated from lagoon sediments .
