= Comamonas aquatica =

Scientific classification
- Domain: Bacteria
- Kingdom: Pseudomonadati
- Phylum: Pseudomonadota
- Class: Betaproteobacteria
- Order: Burkholderiales
- Family: Comamonadaceae
- Genus: Comamonas
- Species: C. aquatica

Binomial name
- Comamonas aquatica (Hylemon et al. 1973) Wauters et al. 2003, comb. nov.

Species of bacterium

Comamonas aquatica is a Gram-negative, oxidase- and catalase-negative, motile bacterium with multitrichous polar flagella from the genus Comamonas and family Comamonadaceae.
