= Comamonas nitrativorans =

Scientific classification
- Domain: Bacteria
- Kingdom: Pseudomonadati
- Phylum: Pseudomonadota
- Class: Betaproteobacteria
- Order: Burkholderiales
- Family: Comamonadaceae
- Genus: Comamonas
- Species: C. nitrativorans

Binomial name
- Comamonas nitrativorans Etchebehere et al. 2001

Type strain
- 23310, CCT 7062, CCUG 45781, CIP 107121, DSM 13191, LMG 20949, NCCB 100007, strain 23310

Species of bacterium

Comamonas nitrativorans is a Gram-negative, oxidase- and catalase-positive bacterium from the genus Comamonas, which was isolated from a denitrifying reactor treating landfill leachate. C. nitrativorans has the ability to perform anoxic-reduction of nitrate, nitrite, and nitrous oxide to nitrogen.
