= Comamonas thiooxydans =

Scientific classification
- Domain: Bacteria
- Kingdom: Pseudomonadati
- Phylum: Pseudomonadota
- Class: Betaproteobacteria
- Order: Burkholderiales
- Family: Comamonadaceae
- Genus: Comamonas
- Species: C. thiooxydans

Binomial name
- Comamonas thiooxydans corrig. Narayan et al. 2011, sp. nov.

Type strain
- DSM 17888, JCM 14801, S23

Species of bacterium

Comamonas thiooxydans is a Gram-negative, rod-shaped bacterium from the genus Comamonas and family Comamonadaceae, which was isolated from a sulfur spring. C. thiooxydans has the ability to oxidize thiosulfate.

Comamonas sp. strain E6 (NBRC 107749), isolated from soil, is known for its ability to oxidize phthalate isomers such as terephthalic acid. Its genome has been sequenced as GCF_001010305.1. Based on this genome, the GTDB assigns strain E6 to Comamonas thiooxydans.
