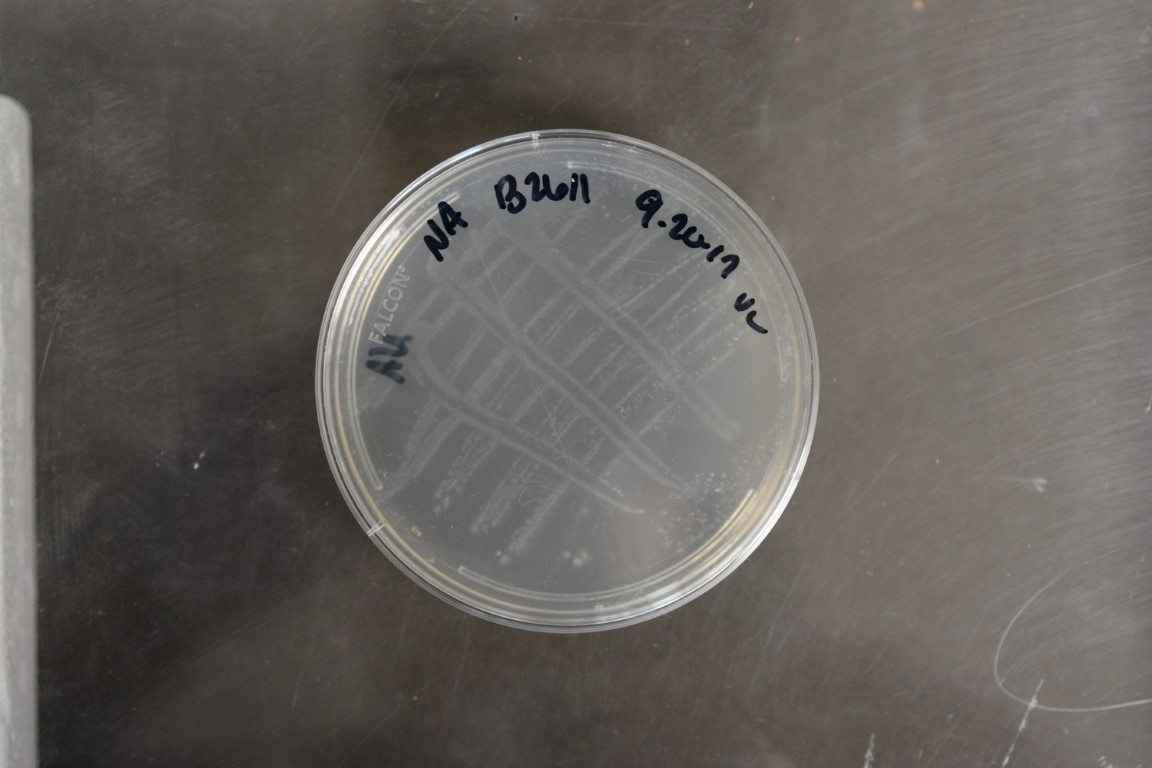

Scientific classification
- Domain: Bacteria
- Kingdom: Pseudomonadati
- Phylum: Pseudomonadota
- Class: Betaproteobacteria
- Order: Burkholderiales
- Family: Comamonadaceae
- Genus: Comamonas
- Species: C. testosteroni

Binomial name
- Comamonas testosteroni (Marcus and Talalay 1956) Tamaoka et al. 1987

Synonyms
- Pseudomonas testosteroni Marcus and Talalay 1956; Pseudomonas dacunhae Arima; Pseudomonas cruciviae Tamaoka, Ha, and Komagata, 1987

= Comamonas testosteroni =

Species of bacterium

Comamonas testosteroni is a Gram-negative environmental bacterium capable of utilizing testosterone as a carbon source, and degrading other sterols such as ergosterol and estrogens. Strain I2gfp has been used in bioaugmentation trials, in attempts to treat the industrial byproduct 3-chloroaniline. It was first classified as a human pathogen in 1987 according to the National Library of Medicine.

== Biodegradation ==
C. testosteroni is studied for the ability of strains in this species to degrade diverse aromatic carbon compounds, including many xenobiotic waste pollutants, such as 4-chloronitrobenzene and 4-hydroxybenzoate. A number of strains of Comamonas, including C. testosteroni, have been shown to consume terephthalic acid, one of the components of PET plastic, as a sole carbon source. C. testosteroni was found to catabolize terephthalate, vanillate, and 4-hydroxybenzoate to a protocatechuate intermediate, which is then degraded by initiation of ring formation at the 4,5-meta position. Because of its ability to degrade aromatic pollutants with relevance to bioremediation, methods for genetic engineering in Comamonas have begun to be developed.

== Virulence ==
Though these organisms have low virulence, they can occasionally cause human diseases. They can be found in intravenous catheters, the respiratory tract, abdomen, urinary tract, and the central nervous system. Symptoms of infection may variously include vomiting, watery diarrhea, and meningitis.
