= Comamonas koreensis =

Scientific classification
- Domain: Bacteria
- Kingdom: Pseudomonadati
- Phylum: Pseudomonadota
- Class: Betaproteobacteria
- Order: Burkholderiales
- Family: Comamonadaceae
- Genus: Comamonas
- Species: C. koreensis

Binomial name
- Comamonas koreensis Chang et al. 2002

Type strain
- CIP 108012, DSM 18232, IMSNU 11158, KCTC 12005, YH-12

Species of bacterium

Comamonas koreensis is a Gram-negative, aerobic, oxidase- and catalase-positive, nonfermentative bacterium with no flagella from the genus Comamonas, which was isolated from a wetland sample in Woopo in the Republic of Korea.
