= Comamonas jiangduensis =

Scientific classification
- Domain: Bacteria
- Kingdom: Pseudomonadati
- Phylum: Pseudomonadota
- Class: Betaproteobacteria
- Order: Burkholderiales
- Family: Comamonadaceae
- Genus: Comamonas
- Species: C. jiangduensis

Binomial name
- Comamonas jiangduensis Sun et al. 2013

Type strain
- CCTCC AB 2012033, YW1, KACC 16697

Species of bacterium

Comamonas jiangduensis is a Gram-negative, non-spore-forming and motile bacterium from the genus Comamonas which has been isolated from soil from a rice field in Jiangdu in China.
