= Comamonas zonglianii =

Scientific classification
- Domain: Bacteria
- Kingdom: Pseudomonadati
- Phylum: Pseudomonadota
- Class: Betaproteobacteria
- Order: Burkholderiales
- Family: Comamonadaceae
- Genus: Comamonas
- Species: C. zonglianii

Binomial name
- Comamonas zonglianii Yu et al. 2011, sp. nov.

Type strain
- BF-3, CCTCC AB 209170, DSM 22523

Species of bacterium

Comamonas zonglianii is a Gram-negative, aerobic, oxidase- and catalase-positive, nonmotile bacterium from the genus Comamonas and family Comamonadaceae, which was isolated from a phenol-contaminated soil. Colonies of C. zonglianii are pale yellow in color.
