= Benzenedicarboxylic acid =

Benzenedicarboxylic acid is a group of chemical compounds which are dicarboxylic derivatives of benzene. Benzenedicarboxylic acid comes in three isomers:

- Phthalic acid (1,2-benzenedicarboxylic acid)
- Isophthalic acid (1,3-benzenedicarboxylic acid)
- Terephthalic acid (1,4-benzenedicarboxylic acid)

Common Name	Phthalic acid	Isophthalic acid	Terephthalic acid
Systematic Name	1,2-benzenedicarboxylic acid	1,3-benzenedicarboxylic acid	1,4-benzenedicarboxylic acid
Structural Formula			
CAS Registry Number	88-99-3	121-91-5	100-21-0

All isomers share the molecular weight 166.13 g/mol and the chemical formula C_{8}H_{6}O_{4}.
