= Comamonas serinivorans =

Scientific classification
- Domain: Bacteria
- Kingdom: Pseudomonadati
- Phylum: Pseudomonadota
- Class: Betaproteobacteria
- Order: Burkholderiales
- Family: Comamonadaceae
- Genus: Comamonas
- Species: C. serinivorans

Binomial name
- Comamonas serinivorans Zhu et al. 2014

Type strain
- SP35, DSM 26136, JCM 18194

Species of bacterium

Comamonas serinivorans is a Gram-negative, rod-shaped and non-spore-forming bacterium from the genus Comamonas which has been isolated from wheat straw compost from the Zhuwan farm, Yuncheng County, Shandong Province, China.
