= Comamonas terrae =

Scientific classification
- Domain: Bacteria
- Kingdom: Pseudomonadati
- Phylum: Pseudomonadota
- Class: Betaproteobacteria
- Order: Burkholderiales
- Family: Comamonadaceae
- Genus: Comamonas
- Species: C. terrae

Binomial name
- Comamonas terrae Chitpirom et al. 2012, sp. nov.

Type strain
- A3-3, NBRC 106524, TISTR 1906

Species of bacterium

Comamonas terrae is a bacterium from the genus Comamonas, which was isolated from agricultural soil in Thailand. C. terrae has an arsenite-oxidizing ability.
