= Racemic acid =

Tartaric acid in pen sketch

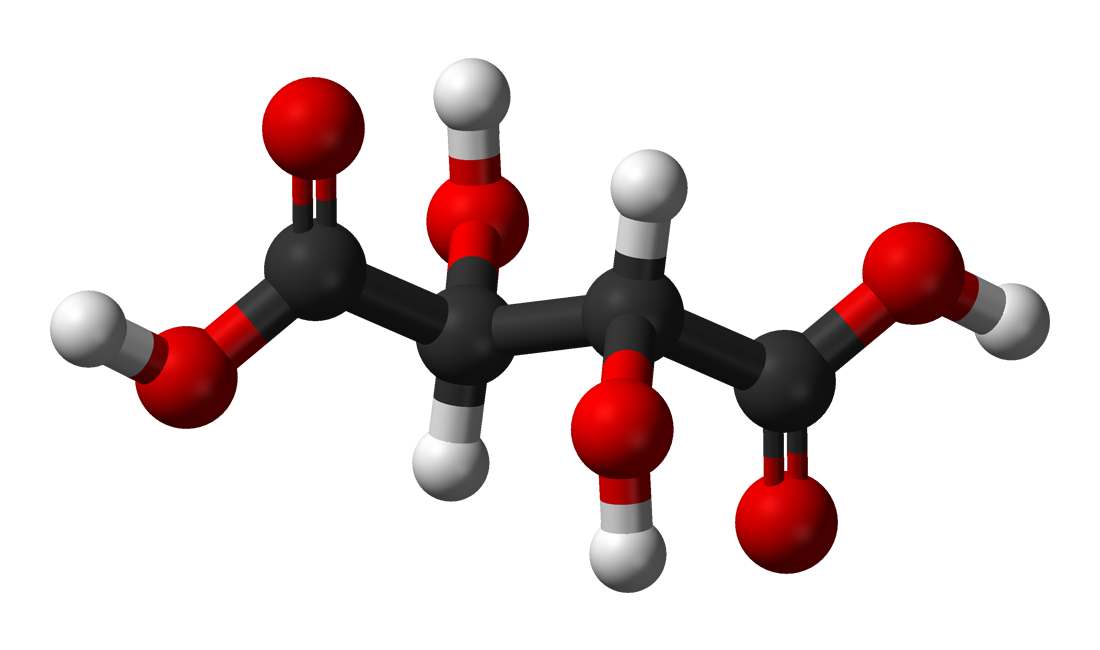
Computer-rendered image of right-handed molecule

Racemic acid crystals drawn as if seen through an optical microscope

Racemic acid is an old name for an optically inactive or racemic form of tartaric acid. It is an equal mixture of two mirror-image isomers (enantiomers), optically active in opposing directions. Racemic acid does not occur naturally in grape juice, although L-tartaric acid does.

Tartaric acid's sodium-ammonium salt is unusual among racemic mixtures in that during crystallization it can separate out into two kinds of crystals, each composed of one isomer, and whose macroscopic crystalline shapes are mirror images of each other. Thus, Louis Pasteur was able in 1848 to isolate each of the two enantiomers by laboriously separating the two kinds of crystals using delicate tweezers and a hand lens. Pasteur announced his intention to resolve racemic acid in:

- Pasteur, Louis (1848) "Sur les relations qui peuvent exister entre la forme cristalline, la composition chimique et le sens de la polarisation rotatoire"

while he presented his resolution of racemic acid into separate optical isomers in:

- Pasteur, Louis (1850) "Recherches sur les propriétés spécifiques des deux acides qui composent l'acide racémique"

In the latter paper, Pasteur sketches from natural concrete reality chiral polytopes quite possibly for the first time. The optical property of tartaric acid was first observed in 1832 by Jean Baptiste Biot, who observed its ability to rotate polarized light. It remains unknown whether Arthur Cayley or Ludwig Schläfli, or other contemporary mathematicians who studied polytopes, knew of the French work.

In two modern-day re-enactments performed in Japan of the Pasteur experiment, it was established that the preparation of crystals was not very reproducible. The crystals deformed, but they were large enough to inspect with the naked eye (microscope not required).

== See also ==
- Tartaric acid
- Uvitic acid
- Uvitonic acid
