= Revefenacin =

Chemical compound

Clinical data
- Trade names: Yupelri
- AHFS/Drugs.com: Monograph
- MedlinePlus: a619009
- License data: US DailyMed: Revefenacin
- Routes of administration: Inhalation
- ATC code: R03BB08 (WHO)

Legal status
- Legal status: US: ℞-only

Identifiers
- CAS Number: 864750-70-9
- PubChem CID: 11753673
- DrugBank: DB11855
- ChemSpider: 9928376
- UNII: G2AE2VE07O
- KEGG: D10978
- CompTox Dashboard (EPA): DTXSID701027775

Chemical and physical data
- Formula: C_{35}H_{43}N_{5}O_{4}
- Molar mass: 597.760 g·mol^{−1}
- 3D model (JSmol): Interactive image
- SMILES: CN(CCN1CCC(CC1)OC(=O)NC2=CC=CC=C2C3=CC=CC=C3)C(=O)C4=CC=C(C=C4)CN5CCC(CC5)C(=O)N
- InChI: InChI=1S/C35H43N5O4/c1-38(34(42)29-13-11-26(12-14-29)25-40-19-15-28(16-20-40)33(36)41)23-24-39-21-17-30(18-22-39)44-35(43)37-32-10-6-5-9-31(32)27-7-3-2-4-8-27/h2-14,28,30H,15-25H2,1H3,(H2,36,41)(H,37,43); Key:FYDWDCIFZSGNBU-UHFFFAOYSA-N

Revefenacin, sold under the brand name Yupelri, is a medication for the treatment of chronic obstructive pulmonary disease (COPD). It was approved for use in the United States in 2018. It was developed by Theravance Biopharma and is marketed by Mylan. Revefenacin is formulated as a solution that is nebulized and inhaled.

Revefenacin is a bronchodilator that exerts its effect as a long-acting muscarinic antagonist.

== Society and culture ==
=== Brand names ===
In some countries, Yupelri is marketed by Viatris after Upjohn merged with Mylan to create Viatris.

== Synthesis ==
The synthesis of revefenacin was recently reported.

skin-invert-image

The reaction between 1-benzylpiperidin-4-ol [4727-72-4] (1) and 1-isocyanato-2-phenylbenzene [605-677-1] (2) gave the urethane [171723-80-1]. Next acid transfer hydrogenation cleaved the benzyl protecting group to give [171722-92-2] (3). The reductive amination with Cbz-sarcosinal [107201-33-2] (4). Catalytic hydrogenation then removed the Cbz group to give [743460-48-2] (5). Amide formation with 4-formylbenzoic acid [619-66-9] (6) gave [864760-28-1] (7). Lastly, a reductive amination reaction with isonipecotamide [39546-32-2] (8) completed the synthesis of revefenacin (9).
