= Comamonas composti =

Scientific classification
- Domain: Bacteria
- Kingdom: Pseudomonadati
- Phylum: Pseudomonadota
- Class: Betaproteobacteria
- Order: Burkholderiales
- Family: Comamonadaceae
- Genus: Comamonas
- Species: C. composti

Binomial name
- Comamonas composti Young et al. 2008, sp. nov

Type strain
- BCRC 17659, CCRC 17659, Chen YY287, LMG 24008, YY287

Species of bacterium

Comamonas composti is an aerobic, Gram-negative, rod-shaped, non-spore-forming, weak oxidase-positive, catalase-positive, motile bacterium from the genus Comamonas and family Comamonadaceae, which was isolated from food waste compost.
