= Comamonas odontotermitis =

Scientific classification
- Domain: Bacteria
- Kingdom: Pseudomonadati
- Phylum: Pseudomonadota
- Class: Betaproteobacteria
- Order: Burkholderiales
- Family: Comamonadaceae
- Genus: Comamonas
- Species: C. odontotermitis

Binomial name
- Comamonas odontotermitis Chou et al. 2007

Type strain
- BCRC 17576, CCRC 17576, Chen strain Dant 3-8, Dant 3-8, LMG 23579

Species of bacterium

Comamonas odontotermitis is a Gram-negative, aerobic, weak oxidase- and catalase-positive, non-spore-forming, rod-shaped, motile bacterium from the genus of Comamonas, which was isolated from the gut of the termite Coptotermes formosanus.
