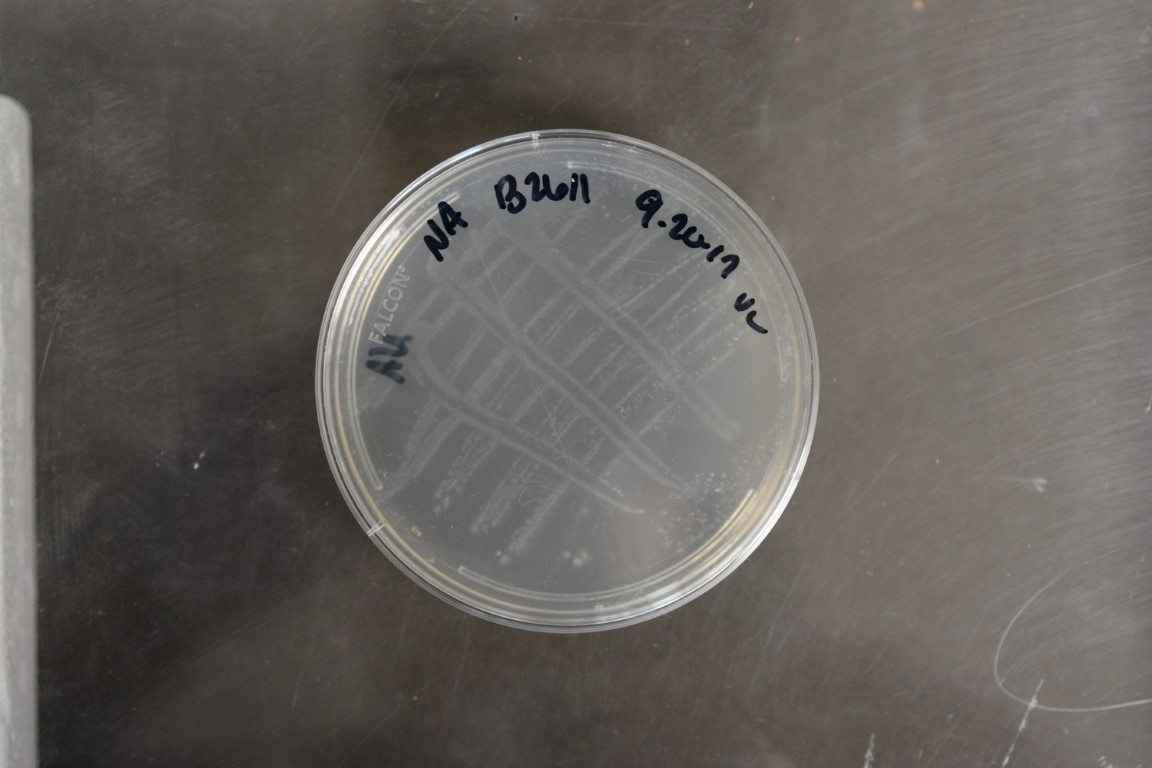
- Comamonas testosteroni

Scientific classification
- Domain: Bacteria
- Kingdom: Pseudomonadati
- Phylum: Pseudomonadota
- Class: Betaproteobacteria
- Order: Burkholderiales
- Family: Comamonadaceae
- Genus: Comamonas (ex Davis and Park 1962); De Vos et al. 1985

Type species
- Comamonas terrigena

Species
- C. acidovorans C. aquatica C. badia C. composti C. denitrificans C. granuli C. guangdongensis C. jiangduensis C. kerstersii C. koreensis C. nitrativorans C. odontotermitis C. phosphati C. piscis C. sediminis C. serinivorans C. terrae C. terrigena C. testosteroni C. thiooxydans C. zonglianii

= Comamonas =

Genus of bacteria

Comamonas is a genus of bacteria in the phylum Pseudomonadota. Like all Pseudomonadota, they are Gram-negative bacteria. Comamonas species are aerobic organisms and motile using bipolar or polar tufts of one to five flagella. Comamonas testosteroni and Comamonas kerstersii have been found to cause infections in people.
