= Comamonas phosphati =

Scientific classification
- Domain: Bacteria
- Kingdom: Pseudomonadati
- Phylum: Pseudomonadota
- Class: Betaproteobacteria
- Order: Burkholderiales
- Family: Comamonadaceae
- Genus: Comamonas
- Species: C. phosphati

Binomial name
- Comamonas phosphati Xie et al. 2016

Type strain
- CGMCC 1.12294, WYH22-41, DSM 26017

Species of bacterium

Comamonas phosphati is a Gram-negative, rod-shaped, facultatively anaerobic and non-spore-forming bacterium from the genus Comamonas which has been isolated from a phosphate mine in Yunnan in China.
