= Comamonas piscis =

Scientific classification
- Domain: Bacteria
- Kingdom: Pseudomonadati
- Phylum: Pseudomonadota
- Class: Betaproteobacteria
- Order: Burkholderiales
- Family: Comamonadaceae
- Genus: Comamonas
- Species: C. piscis

Binomial name
- Comamonas piscis Kang et al. 2016

Type strain
- CN1, JCM 30718, KACC 18403

Species of bacterium

Comamonas piscis is a Gram-negative, obligately aerobic and non-motile bacterium from the genus Comamonas which has been isolated from the intestine of the fish Sebastes schlegelii.
