= Comamonas acidovorans =

Scientific classification
- Domain: Bacteria
- Kingdom: Pseudomonadati
- Phylum: Pseudomonadota
- Class: Betaproteobacteria
- Order: Burkholderiales
- Family: Comamonadaceae
- Genus: Comamonas
- Species: C. acidovorans

Binomial name
- Comamonas acidovorans Tamaoka et al. 1987, comb. nov.

Type strain
- 2167, 85004, ACM 489, AJ 3117, ATCC 15668, BCRC 14819, CBMAI 692, CBMAI 693, CCEB 863, CCRC 14819, CCTM La 1849, CCUG 12692, CCUG 14481, CDBB 583, CECT 311, CFBP 2444, CGMCC 1.3363, CIP 103021, CNCTC 159/78, den Dooren de Jong 7, DSM 39, DSM 50251, Hugh 2167, IAM 12409, ICS0057, IFO 14950, IMET 10620, JCM 5833, JCM 6203, KCTC 2991, Kosako 85014, KS 0057, L.E. den Dooren de Jong 7, LMD 26.37, LMD 84.19, LMG 1226, LMG 6031, LMG 8910, LMG 8911, NBRC 14950, NCCB 26037, NCCB 84019, NCIB 9681, NCIM 2861, NCIMB 9681, NCTC 10683, NCTC 1085T, NCTC 10859, Palleroni # 14, Palleroni 14, R-17763, R.Hugh 2167, R.Y. Stanier 14, R.Y.Stanier 14, RH 2167, Stanier 14, strain RF50, USCC 2036, VTT E-86250

Synonyms
- Pseudomonas acidovorans, Delftia acidovorans

Species of bacterium

Comamonas acidovorans is a Gram-negative, non-spore-forming, aerobic, rod-shaped bacterium from the genus Comamonas and family Comamonadaceae. C. acidovorans occur in soil, mud, and water in Japan, the Netherlands, Great Britain, the US, Spain, and Sweden. It has a major role in natural biodegradation.
