= 4,5:9,10-diseco-3-hydroxy-5,9,17-trioxoandrosta-1(10),2-diene-4-oate hydrolase =

Class of enzymes

Identifiers
- EC no.: 3.7.1.17

Databases
- BRENDA: enzyme data
- ExPASy: NiceZyme view
- KEGG: enzyme entry
- MetaCyc: metabolic pathway
- Rhea: reactions
- PDB structures: RCSB PDB PDBe PDBsum
Search
- PMC: articles
- PubMed: articles
- NCBI: proteins

4,5:9,10-diseco-3-hydroxy-5,9,17-trioxoandrosta-1(10),2-diene-4-oate hydrolase (EC 3.7.1.17, tesD (gene), hsaD (gene)) is an enzyme with systematic name 4,5:9,10-diseco-3-hydroxy-5,9,17-trioxoandrosta-1(10),2-diene-4-oate hydrolase ( (2Z,4Z)-2-hydroxyhexa-2,4-dienoate-forming). It is involved in a pathway for breakdown of steroid hormones in bacteria. In Comamonas testosteroni it catalyses the hydrolysis of (1E,2Z)-3-hydroxy-5,9,17-trioxo-4,5:9,10-disecoandrosta-1(10),2-dien-4-oic acid (1) to 9,17-dioxo-1,2,3,4,10,19-hexanorandrostan-5-oic acid (2) and (2Z,4Z)-2-hydroxyhexa-2,4-dienoate (3), in a sequence that starts with testosterone:

(1)
H_{2}O
(2)
+
(3)

In Mycobacterium tuberculosis the same reaction is associated with cholesterol metabolism.
