= Isophthalic acid =

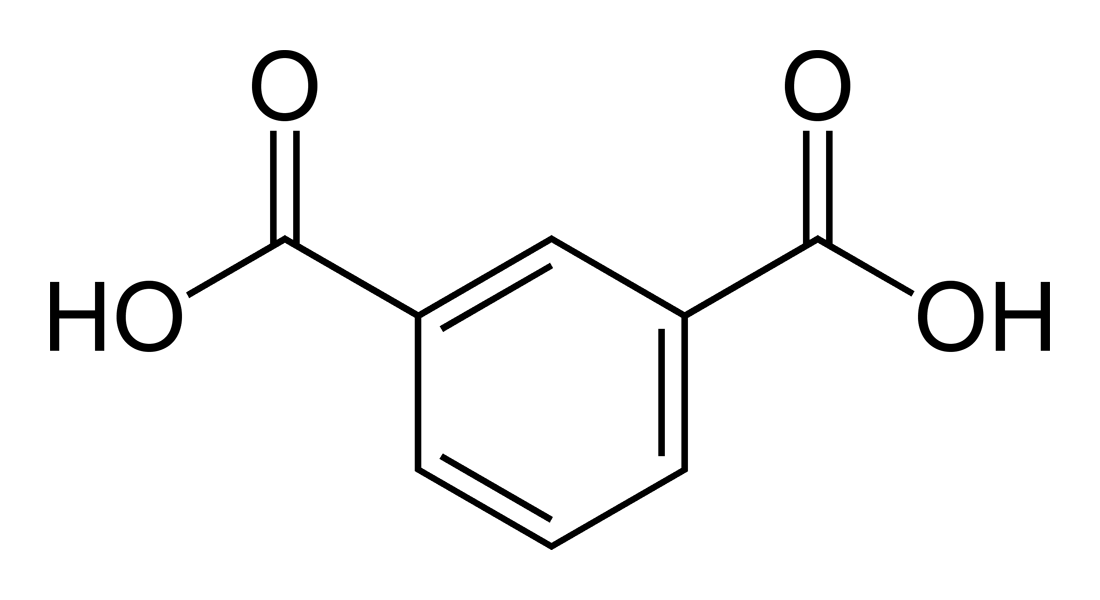
- Skeletal formula

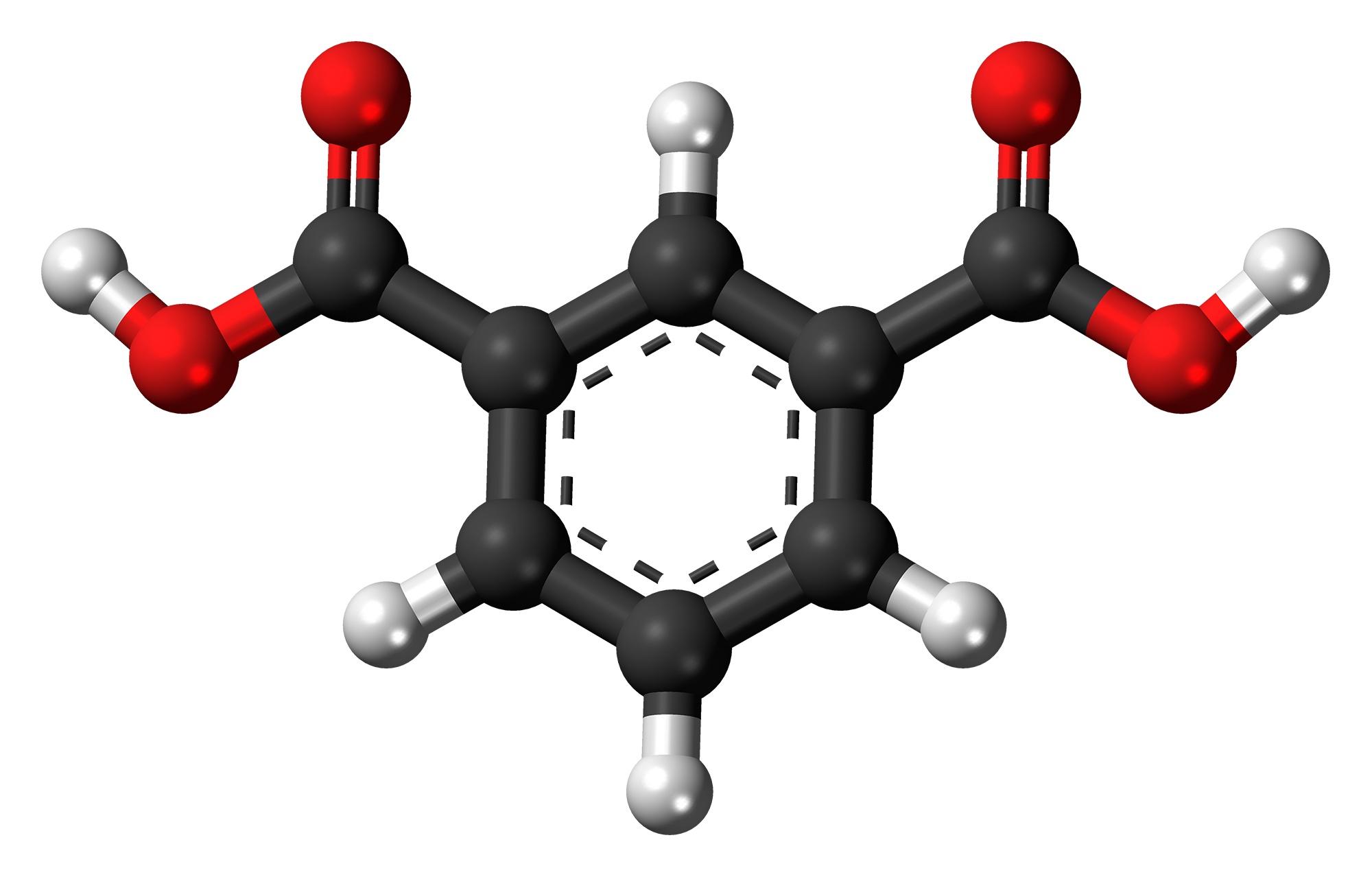

Names
- Preferred IUPAC name Benzene-1,3-dicarboxylic acid
- Other names Isophthalic acid meta-Phthalic acid

Identifiers
| CAS Number | 121-91-5 |
| 3D model (JSmol) | Interactive image |
| ChEBI | CHEBI:30802 |
| ChemSpider | 8182 |
| ECHA InfoCard | 100.004.098 |
| PubChem CID | 8496 |
| UNII | X35216H9FJ |
| CompTox Dashboard (EPA) | DTXSID3021485 |
- InChI: InChI=1S/C8H6O4/c9-7(10)5-2-1-3-6(4-5)8(11)12/h1-4H,(H,9,10)(H,11,12) Key: QQVIHTHCMHWDBS-UHFFFAOYSA-N; InChI=1/C8H6O4/c9-7(10)5-2-1-3-6(4-5)8(11)12/h1-4H,(H,9,10)(H,11,12) Key: QQVIHTHCMHWDBS-UHFFFAOYAY
- SMILES: O=C(O)c1cccc(C(=O)O)c1

Properties
| Chemical formula | C_{8}H_{6}O_{4} |
| Molar mass | 166.132 g·mol^{−1} |
| Appearance | White crystalline solid |
| Density | 1.526 g/cm^{3}, Solid |
| Solubility in water | Insoluble |
| Acidity (pK_{a}) | 3.46, 4.46 |
| Magnetic susceptibility (χ) | −84.64·10^{−6} cm^{3}/mol |

Related compounds
| Related carboxylic acids | Benzoic acid Phthalic acid (ortho); Terephthalic acid (para); Trimesic acid |
- Except where otherwise noted, data are given for materials in their standard state (at 25 °C [77 °F], 100 kPa). verify (what is ?) Infobox references

Isophthalic acid is an organic compound with the formula C_{6}H_{4}(CO_{2}H)_{2}. It is a white solid that is very poorly soluble in water (0.012 g/100 mL at room temperature). The main industrial uses of purified isophthalic acid (PIA) are as a comonomer in the production of polyethylene terephthalate (PET) resin and for the production of unsaturated polyester resin (UPR) and other types of coating resins.

== Structure ==
Isophthalic acid is one of three isomeric benzenedicarboxylic acids, the others are phthalic acid and terephthalic acid. Crystalline isophthalic acid is built up from molecules connected by hydrogen bonds, forming infinite chains.

== Preparation ==
Isophthalic acid is produced by oxidizing meta-xylene using oxygen:

C_{6}H_{4}(CH_{3})_{2} + 3O_{2} → C_{6}H_{4}(CO_{2}H)_{2} + 2 H_{2}O

The approach is comparable to some routes to terephthalic acid.

The barium salt, as its hexahydrate, is very soluble in water (a distinction between phthalic and terephthalic acids). Uvitic acid, 5-methylisophthalic acid, is obtained by oxidizing mesitylene or by condensing pyroracemic acid with baryta water.
