= Uvitonic acid =

Names
- Preferred IUPAC name 6-Methylpyridine-2,4-dicarboxylic acid
- Other names: 6-Methyl-pyridine-2,4-dicarboxylic acid; 6-Methylcinchomeronic acid; 6-Methyl-2,4-pyridinedicarboxylic acid

Identifiers
CAS Number	499-50-3
3D model (JSmol)	Interactive image
ChemSpider	14208829
PubChem CID	12059143
UNII	X7MQU282AW
- InChI: InChI=1S/C8H7NO4/c1-4-2-5(7(10)11)3-6(9-4)8(12)13/h2-3H,1H3,(H,10,11)(H,12,13) Key: KPJDOBLKTXEADO-UHFFFAOYSA-N
- SMILES: CC1=NC=C(C(O)=O)C(=C1)C(O)=O

Properties
Chemical formula	C_{8}H_{7}NO_{4}
Molar mass	181.145480 g/mol

Hazards
- GHS labelling
Pictograms	(GHS07: Exclamation mark)
Signal word	Warning
Hazard statements	H315, H319, H335
Precautionary statements	P261, P264, P264+P265, P271, P280, P302+P352, P304+P340, P305+P351+P338, P319, P321, P332+P317, P337+P317, P362+P364, P403+P233, P405, P501

Related compounds
Related compounds	Uvitic acid
- Except where otherwise noted, data are given for materials in their standard state (at 25 °C [77 °F], 100 kPa). Infobox references

Uvitonic acid (6-methyl-2,4-pyridinedicarboxylic acid) is an organic compound with the formula CH_{3}C_{5}H_{2}N(COOH)_{2}. The acid is a pyridine analogue of the benzene derivative uvitic acid. Under normal conditions, the acid is a white crystalline substance.

== Preparation ==
Uvitonic acid is obtained by the action of ammonia on pyruvic acid.
