= Primary standard =

Highest-quality standard in metrology or chemistry

A primary standard in metrology is a standard that is sufficiently accurate such that it is not calibrated by or subordinate to other standards. Primary standards are defined via other quantities like length, mass and time. Primary standards are used to calibrate other standards referred to as working standards. See Hierarchy of Standards.

== In chemistry ==
Standards are used in analytical chemistry. In this field, primary standard is typically a reagent that can be weighed easily, and which is so pure that its weight is the number of moles of substance contained. Features of a primary standard include:

1. High purity
2. Stability (low reactivity)
3. Low hygroscopicity (to minimize weight changes due to humidity)
4. High equivalent weight (to minimize weighing errors)
5. Long lasting molar solution i.e. concentration remains unchanged for long periods of time

Some examples of primary standards for titration of solutions, based on their high purity, are provided:

- Arsenic trioxide for making sodium arsenite solution for standardisation of sodium periodate solution (until Ph. Eur. 3, Appendix 2001 also for iodine and cerium(IV) sulfate solutions, since Ph. Eur. 4, 2002 standardised by sodium thiosulfate)
- Benzoic acid
- Potassium bromate (KBrO_{3}) (for standardisation of sodium thiosulfate solutions) and potassium iodate
- Potassium hydrogen phthalate (usually called KHP) for standardisation of aqueous base
- Sodium carbonate for standardisation of aqueous acids: hydrochloric, sulfuric acid and nitric acid solutions (but not acetic acid)
- Sodium chloride for standardisation of silver nitrate solutions
- Sulfanilic acid for standardisation of sodium nitrite solutions
- potassium ferrocyanide, a reductant
- potassium dichromate, an oxidant

Such standards are often used to make standard solutions. These primary standards are used in titration and are essential for determining unknown concentrations or preparing working standards.

== See also ==
- Technical standard
