= Comamonas terrigena =

Scientific classification
- Domain: Bacteria
- Kingdom: Pseudomonadati
- Phylum: Pseudomonadota
- Class: Betaproteobacteria
- Order: Burkholderiales
- Family: Comamonadaceae
- Genus: Comamonas
- Species: C. terrigena

Binomial name
- Comamonas terrigena De Vos et al. 1985, sp. nov., nom. rev.

Type strain
- NCTC 1937, CCUG 15327, CCUG 2185, CIP 63.44, LMG 1253, LMG 5929, M. Veron 31, NCIB 8193, NRRL B-1055, NRRL B-781, R. Hugh 247

Species of bacterium

Comamonas terrigena is a Gram-negative, rod-shaped bacterium from the genus Comamonas and the family of Comamonadaceae, which was isolated from contaminated soil in Slovakia. C. terrigena has the ability to degrade phenols.
