= Bavisant =

Clinical data
- Other names: BEN-2001; BEN2001; JNJ-1074; JNJ1074; JNJ-31001074; JNJ31001074
- Routes of administration: Oral
- Drug class: Histamine H_{3} receptor receptor antagonist; Wakefulness-promoting agent
- ATC code: None

Pharmacokinetic data
- Elimination half-life: 14–22 hours

Identifiers
- IUPAC name: (4-cyclopropylpiperazin-1-yl)-[4-(morpholin-4-ylmethyl)phenyl]methanone
- CAS Number: 929622-08-2
- PubChem CID: 16061509
- DrugBank: DB12299
- ChemSpider: 17221147
- UNII: 9827P7LFVH
- KEGG: D09870
- ChEMBL: ChEMBL2103862

Chemical and physical data
- Formula: C_{19}H_{27}N_{3}O_{2}
- Molar mass: 329.444 g·mol^{−1}
- 3D model (JSmol): Interactive image
- SMILES: C1CC1N2CCN(CC2)C(=O)C3=CC=C(C=C3)CN4CCOCC4
- InChI: InChI=1S/C19H27N3O2/c23-19(22-9-7-21(8-10-22)18-5-6-18)17-3-1-16(2-4-17)15-20-11-13-24-14-12-20/h1-4,18H,5-15H2; Key:BGBVSGSIXIIREO-UHFFFAOYSA-N

Bavisant (INN, USAN; developmental code names BEN-2001 and JNJ-31001074) is a histamine H_{3} receptor receptor antagonist which was under development for the treatment of narcolepsy and attention deficit hyperactivity disorder (ADHD) but was never marketed. It is taken orally.

The drug is potent and highly selective for the histamine H_{3} receptor (K_{i} = 5.4 nM). Bavisant produces wakefulness-promoting effects in animals and humans, but can also cause insomnia. Its elimination half-life is 14 to 22 hours while its effective half-life is 13 to 20 hours.

Bavisant was under development by BenevolentAI and Johnson & Johnson. It reached phase 2 clinical trials for both narcolepsy and ADHD prior to the discontinuation of its development in 2022. The drug was not effective for the treatment of ADHD in a large clinical trial. Besides the preceding indications, it was also studied for the treatment of alcoholism. In 2026, bavisant was identified as a potential therapeutic agent for the treatment of multiple sclerosis.

== See also ==
- List of investigational attention deficit hyperactivity disorder drugs
- List of investigational narcolepsy and hypersomnia drugs
- Histamine H_{3} receptor antagonist
- Wakefulness-promoting agent
