= Racemic mixture =

Mixture with equal amounts of left- and right-handed chiral isomers

In chemistry, a racemic mixture or racemate (/reɪˈsiːmeɪt, rə-, ˈræsɪmeɪt/) is a mixture that has equal amounts (50:50) of left- and right-handed enantiomers of a chiral molecule or salt. Racemic mixtures are rare in nature, but many compounds are produced industrially as racemates.

== History ==
The first known racemic mixture was racemic acid, which Louis Pasteur found to be a mixture of the two enantiomeric isomers of tartaric acid. He manually separated the crystals of a mixture, starting from an aqueous solution of the sodium ammonium salt of racemate tartaric acid. Pasteur benefited from the fact that ammonium tartrate salt gives enantiomeric crystals with distinct crystal forms (at 25 °C (77 °F)). Reasoning from the macroscopic scale down to the molecular, he reckoned that the molecules had to have non-superimposable mirror images. A sample with only a single enantiomer is an enantiomerically pure or enantiopure compound.

== Etymology ==
The word racemic derives from Latin racemus, meaning pertaining to a bunch of grapes. Racemic acid, when naturally produced in grapes, is only the right-handed version of the molecule, better known as tartaric acid. In many Germanic languages racemic acid is called "grape acid", e.g. German Traubensäure and Swedish druvsyra. Carl von Linné gave red elderberry the scientific name Sambucus racemosa as the Swedish name, druvfläder, means 'grape elder', so called because its berries grow in a grape-like cluster.

== Nomenclature ==
A racemic mixture is denoted by the prefix (±)- or dl- (for sugars the prefix dl- may be used), indicating an equal (1:1) mixture of dextro and levo isomers. Also the prefix rac- (or racem-) or the symbols RS and SR (all in italic letters) are used.

If the ratio is not 1:1 (or is not known), the prefix (+)/(−), d/l- or d/l- (with a slash) is used instead.

The usage of d and l is discouraged by IUPAC.

== Properties ==
A racemate is optically inactive (achiral), meaning that such materials do not rotate the polarization of plane-polarized light. Although the two enantiomers rotate plane-polarized light in opposite directions, the rotations cancel each other out because they are present in equal amounts of negative (-) counterclockwise (levorotatory) and positive (+) clockwise (dextrorotatory) enantiomers.

In contrast to the two pure enantiomers, which have identical physical properties except for the direction of rotation of plane-polarized light, a racemate sometimes has different properties from either of the pure enantiomers. Different melting points are most common, but different solubilities and boiling points are also possible.

Pharmaceuticals may be available as a racemate or as the pure enantiomer, which might have different potencies. Because biological systems have many chiral asymmetries, pure enantiomers frequently have very different biological effects; examples include glucose and methamphetamine.

== Crystallization ==
There are four ways to crystallize a racemate; three of which H. W. B. Roozeboom had distinguished by 1899:

Conglomerate (sometimes racemic conglomerate)
If the molecules of the substance have a much greater affinity for the same enantiomer than for the opposite one, a mechanically separable mixture of enantiomerically pure crystals will result. The mixture of enantiomerically pure R and S crystals forms a eutectic mixture. Consequently, the melting point of the conglomerate is always lower than that of the pure enantiomer. Addition of a small amount of one enantiomer to the conglomerate increases the melting point. Roughly 10% of racemic chiral compounds crystallize as conglomerates.
Racemic mixture (sometimes true racemate)
If molecules have a greater affinity for the opposite enantiomer than for the same enantiomer, the substance forms a single crystalline phase in which the two enantiomers are present in an ordered 1:1 ratio in the unit cell. Adding a small amount of one enantiomer to the racemic compound decreases the melting point. But the pure enantiomer can have a higher or lower melting point than the mixture. A special case of racemic mixtures are kryptoracemic compounds (or kryptoracemates), in which the crystal itself has handedness (is enantiomorphic), despite containing both enantiomorphs in a 1:1 ratio.
Pseudoracemate (sometimes racemic solid solution)
When there is no big difference in affinity between the same and opposite enantiomers, then in contrast to the racemic compound and the conglomerate, the two enantiomers will coexist in an unordered manner in the crystal lattice. Addition of a small amount of one enantiomer changes the melting point slightly or not at all.
Quasiracemate
A quasiracemate is a co-crystal of two similar but distinct compounds, one of which is left-handed and the other right-handed. Although chemically different, they are sterically similar (isosteric) and are still able to form a racemic crystalline phase. One of the first such racemates studied, by Pasteur in 1853, forms from a 1:2 mixture of the bis ammonium salt of (+)-tartaric acid and the bis ammonium salt of (−)-malic acid in water. Re-investigated in 2008, the crystals formed are dumbbell-shape with the central part consisting of ammonium (+)-bitartrate, whereas the outer parts are a quasiracemic mixture of ammonium (+)-bitartrate and ammonium (−)-bimalate.

== Resolution ==
The separation of a racemate into its components, the individual enantiomers, is called a chiral resolution. Various methods exist for this separation, including crystallization, chromatography, and the use of various reagents.

== Synthesis ==
Without a chiral influence (for example a chiral catalyst, solvent or starting material), a chemical reaction that makes a chiral product will always yield a racemate. That can make the synthesis of a racemate cheaper and easier than making the pure enantiomer, because it does not require special conditions. This fact also leads to the question of how biological homochirality evolved on what is presumed to be a racemic primordial earth.

The reagents of, and the reactions that produce, racemic mixtures are said to be "not stereospecific" or "not stereoselective", for their indecision in a particular stereoisomerism. A frequent scenario is that of a planar species (such as an sp^{2} carbon atom or a carbocation intermediate) acting as an electrophile. The nucleophile will have a 50% probability of 'hitting' either of the two sides of the planar grouping, thus producing a racemic mixture:

== Racemic pharmaceuticals ==
Some drug molecules are chiral, and the enantiomers have different effects on biological entities. They can be sold as one enantiomer or as a racemic mixture. Examples include thalidomide, ibuprofen, cetirizine and salbutamol. A well known drug that has different effects depending on its ratio of enantiomers is amphetamine. Adderall is an unequal mixture of both amphetamine enantiomers. A single Adderall dose combines the neutral sulfate salts of dextroamphetamine and amphetamine, with the dextro isomer of amphetamine saccharate and D/L-amphetamine aspartate monohydrate. The original benzedrine was a racemic mixture, and isolated dextroamphetamine was later introduced to the market as Dexedrine. The prescription analgesic tramadol is also a racemate.

In some cases (e.g., ibuprofen and thalidomide), the enantiomers interconvert or racemize in vivo. This means that preparing a pure enantiomer for medication is largely pointless. However, sometimes samples containing pure enantiomers may be made and sold at a higher cost in cases where the use requires specifically one isomer (e.g., for a stereospecific reagent); compare omeprazole and esomeprazole. Moving from a racemic drug to a chiral specific drug may be done for a better safety profile or an improved therapeutic index. This process is called chiral switching and the resulting enantiopure drug is called a chiral switch. As examples, esomeprazole is a chiral switch of (±)-omeprazole and levocetirizine is a chiral switch of (±)-cetirizine.

While often only one enantiomer of the drug may be active, there are cases in which the other enantiomer is harmful, like salbutamol and thalidomide. The (R) enantiomer of thalidomide is effective against morning sickness, while the (S) enantiomer is teratogenic, causing birth defects. Since the drug racemizes, the drug cannot be considered safe for use by women of child-bearing age, and its use is tightly controlled when used for treating other illness.

Methamphetamine is available by prescription under the brand name Desoxyn. The active component of Desoxyn is dextromethamphetamine hydrochloride. This is the right-handed isomer of methamphetamine. The left-handed isomer of methamphetamine, levomethamphetamine, is an OTC drug that is less centrally-acting and more peripherally-acting. Methedrine during the 20th century was a 50:50 racemic mixture of both methamphetamine isomers (levo and dextro).

== Wallach's rule ==
Wallach's rule (first proposed by Otto Wallach) states that racemic crystals tend to be denser than their chiral counterparts. This rule has been substantiated by crystallographic database analysis.

== See also ==
- Chiral switch
- Chirality (same as optical isomerism)
- Descriptor (chemistry)
- Racemic (protein) crystallography
- Racemization
- Skeletal formula § Stereochemistry which describes how stereochemistry is denoted in skeletal formulae
