= Uvitic acid =

Names
- Preferred IUPAC name 5-Methylbenzene-1,3-dicarboxylic acid
- Other names 5-Methyl-1,3-benzenedicarboxylic acid; 3,5-Dicarboxytoluene; 5-Methylisophthalic acid

Identifiers
| CAS Number | 499-49-0 |
| 3D model (JSmol) | Interactive image |
| ChemSpider | 61445 |
| ECHA InfoCard | 100.007.166 |
| EC Number | 207-881-2 |
| PubChem CID | 68137 |
| UNII | L828A4V3R6 |
| CompTox Dashboard (EPA) | DTXSID50198143 |
- InChI: InChI=1S/C9H8O4/c1-5-2-6(8(10)11)4-7(3-5)9(12)13/h2-4H,1H3,(H,10,11)(H,12,13) Key: PMZBHPUNQNKBOA-UHFFFAOYSA-N
- SMILES: Cc1cc(cc(c1)C(=O)O)C(=O)O

Properties
| Chemical formula | C_{9}H_{8}O_{4} |
| Molar mass | 180.159 g·mol^{−1} |
| Appearance | White crystalline solid |
| Density | 1.4±0.1 g/cm^{3} |
| Melting point | 298 °C |
| Boiling point | 408.7±33.0 °C at 760 mmHg |
| Vapor pressure | 0.0±1.0 mmHg at 25°C |

Hazards
- GHS labelling
| Pictograms | (GHS07: Exclamation mark) |
| Signal word | Warning |
| Hazard statements | H315, H319, H335 |
| Precautionary statements | P261, P264, P271, P280, P302+P352, P304+P340, P305+P351+P338, P312, P321, P332+P313, P337+P313, P362, P403+P233, P405, P501 |
| Flash point | 215.1±21.9 °C |

Related compounds
| Related compounds | Uvitonic acid |
- Except where otherwise noted, data are given for materials in their standard state (at 25 °C [77 °F], 100 kPa). Infobox references

Uvitic acid (5-methylisophthalic acid) is an organic compound with the formula CH_{3}C_{6}H_{3}(COOH)_{2}. The name comes from Latin uva which means a grape. The acid is called so because it may be produced indirectly from tartaric acid, which is found in the grape. Under normal conditions, the acid is a white crystalline substance.

== Preparation ==
Uvitic acid is obtained by oxidizing mesitylene.
