= Building block (chemistry) =

Term in chemistry

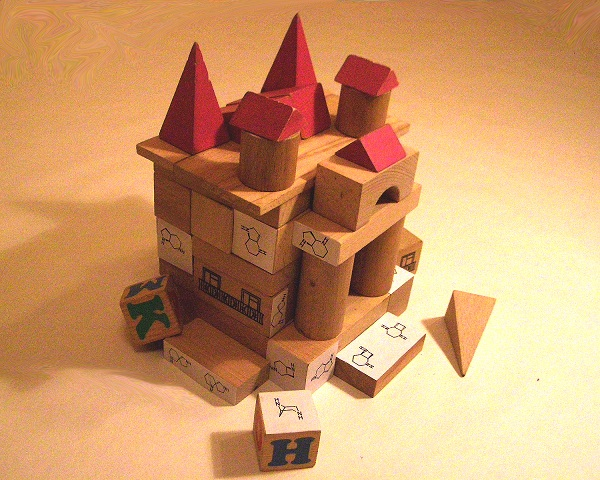
Construction of complex molecular architectures is easily possible using simple building blocks

Building block is a term in chemistry which is used to describe a virtual molecular fragment or a real chemical compound the molecules of which possess reactive functional groups. Building blocks are used for bottom-up modular assembly of molecular architectures: nano-particles, metal-organic frameworks, organic molecular constructs, supra-molecular complexes. Using building blocks ensures strict control of what a final compound or a (supra)molecular construct will be.

== Building blocks for medicinal chemistry ==
In medicinal chemistry, the term defines either imaginable, virtual molecular fragments or chemical reagents from which drugs or drug candidates might be constructed or synthetically prepared.

=== Virtual building blocks ===
Virtual building blocks are used in drug discovery for drug design and virtual screening, addressing the desire to have controllable molecular morphologies that interact with biological targets. Of special interest for this purpose are the building blocks common to known biologically active compounds, in particular, known drugs, or natural products. There are algorithms for de novo design of molecular architectures by assembly of drug-derived virtual building blocks.

=== Chemical reagents as building blocks ===
Organic functionalized molecules (reagents), carefully selected for the use in modular synthesis of novel drug candidates, in particular, by combinatorial chemistry, or in order to realize the ideas of virtual screening and drug design are also called building blocks. To be practically useful for the modular drug or drug candidate assembly, the building blocks should be either mono-functionalised or possessing selectively chemically addressable functional groups, for example, orthogonally protected. Selection criteria applied to organic functionalized molecules to be included in the building block collections for medicinal chemistry are usually based on empirical rules aimed at drug-like properties of the final drug candidates. Bioisosteric replacements of the molecular fragments in drug candidates could be made using analogous building blocks.

=== Building blocks and chemical industry ===
The building block approach to drug discovery changed the landscape of chemical industry which supports medicinal chemistry. Major chemical suppliers for medicinal chemistry like Maybridge, Chembridge, Enamine adjusted their business correspondingly. By the end of the 1990th the use of building block collections prepared for fast and reliable construction of small-molecule sets of compounds (libraries) for biological screening became one of the major strategies for pharmaceutical industry involved in drug discovery; modular, usually one-step synthesis of compounds for biological screening from building blocks turned out to be in most cases faster and more reliable than multistep, even convergent syntheses of target compounds.

There are online web-resources.

== Examples ==
Typical examples of building block collections for medicinal chemistry are libraries of fluorine-containing building blocks. Introduction of the fluorine into a molecule has been shown to be beneficial for its pharmacokinetic and pharmacodynamic properties, therefore, the fluorine-substituted building blocks in drug design increase the probability of finding drug leads. Other examples include natural and unnatural amino acid libraries, collections of conformationally constrained bifunctionalized compounds and diversity-oriented building block collections.

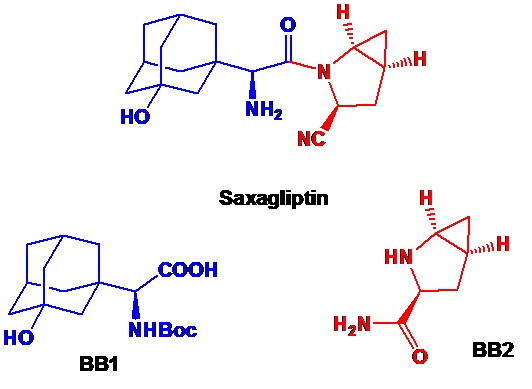
An anti-diabetic drug Saxagliptin and two building blocks BB1 and BB2 from which it could be synthesized
