= Terephthalic acid =

- Skeletal formula

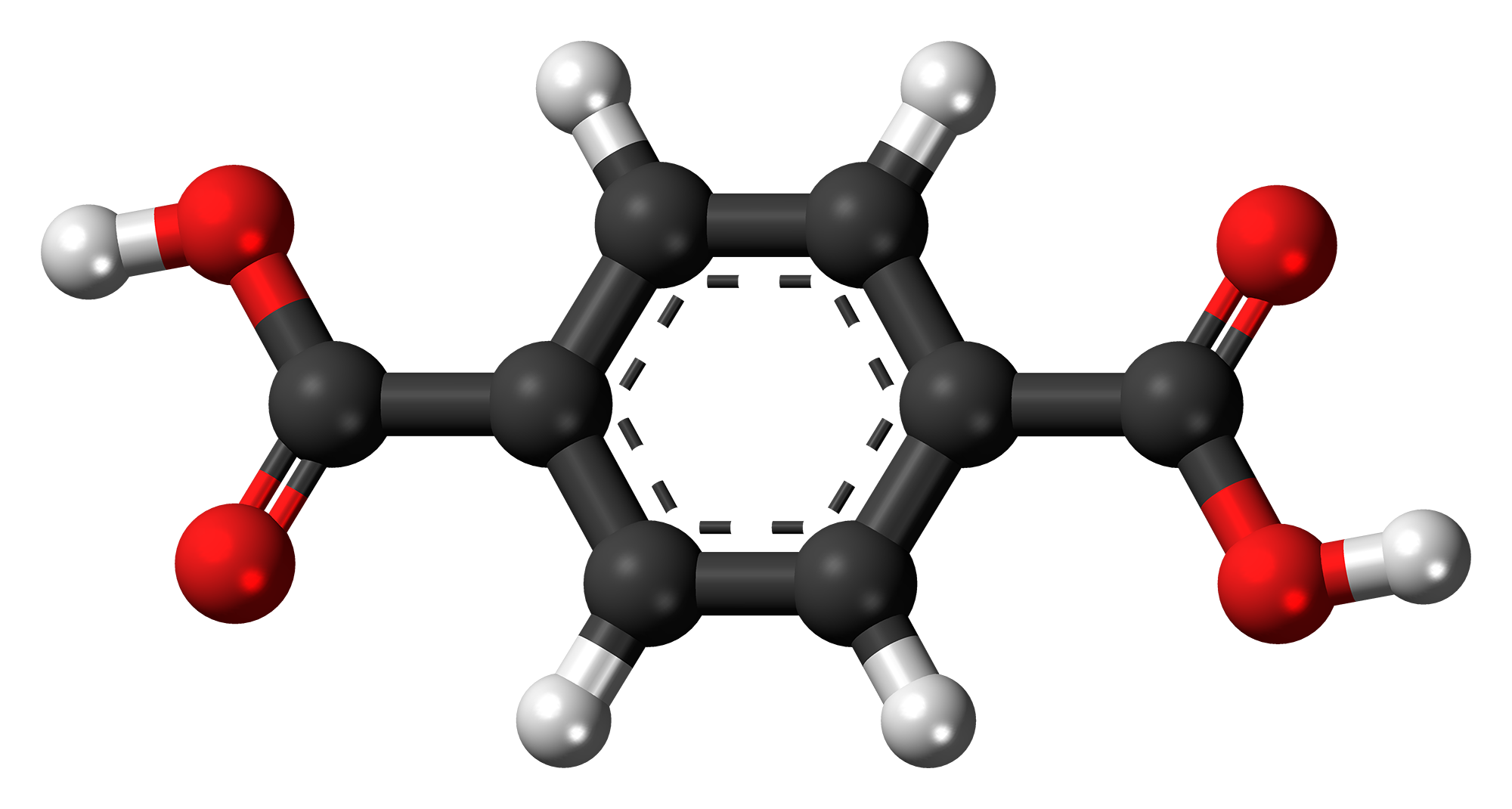
- Ball-and-stick model of the terephthalic acid molecule

Names
- Preferred IUPAC name Benzene-1,4-dicarboxylic acid
- Other names: Terephthalic acid; para-Phthalic acid

Identifiers
CAS Number	100-21-0
3D model (JSmol)	Interactive image
Abbreviations	TPA; PTA; BDC
Beilstein Reference	1909333
ChEBI	CHEBI:15702
ChEMBL	ChEMBL1374420
ChemSpider	7208
ECHA InfoCard	100.002.573
EC Number	202-830-0
Gmelin Reference	50561
KEGG	C06337
PubChem CID	7489
RTECS number	WZ0875000
UNII	6S7NKZ40BQ
CompTox Dashboard (EPA)	DTXSID6026080
- InChI: InChI=1S/C8H6O4/c9-7(10)5-1-2-6(4-3-5)8(11)12/h1-4H,(H,9,10)(H,11,12) Key: KKEYFWRCBNTPAC-UHFFFAOYSA-N; InChI=1/C8H6O4/c9-7(10)5-1-2-6(4-3-5)8(11)12/h1-4H,(H,9,10)(H,11,12) Key: KKEYFWRCBNTPAC-UHFFFAOYAF
- SMILES: O=C(O)c1ccc(C(O)=O)cc1

Properties
Chemical formula	C_{8}H_{6}O_{4}
Molar mass	166.132 g·mol^{−1}
Appearance	White crystals or powder
Density	1.519 g/cm^{3}
Boiling point	300 °C (572 °F; 573 K) Sublimes
Solubility in water	Insoluble
Solubility in Carbon tetrachloride	Soluble
Acidity (pK_{a})	Step 1: 3.54, Step 2: 4.34
Magnetic susceptibility (χ)	83.5×10^{−6} cm^{3}/mol
Dipole moment	2.6 D

Thermochemistry
Std enthalpy of formation (Δ_{f}H^{⦵}_{298})	−816.1 kJ⋅mol^{−1} (solid); −717.9 kJ⋅mol^{−1} (gas)

Hazards
- GHS labelling
Pictograms	(GHS07: Exclamation mark)
Signal word	Warning
Hazard statements	H315, H319, H335
Precautionary statements	P261, P264, P271, P280, P302+P352, P304+P340, P305+P351+P338, P312, P321, P332+P313, P337+P313, P362, P403+P233, P405, P501
Flash point	260 °C (500 °F; 533 K)
Autoignition temperature	496 °C (925 °F; 769 K)
Threshold limit value (TLV)	10 mg/m^{3} (STEL)
- Lethal dose or concentration (LD, LC)
LD_{50} (median dose)	>1000 mg/kg (oral, mouse)
Safety data sheet (SDS)	MSDS sheet

Related compounds
Related carboxylic acids	Phthalic acid; Isophthalic acid; Benzoic acid; p-Toluic acid
Related compounds	p-Xylene; Polyethylene terephthalate; Dimethyl terephthalate

Supplementary data page
- Terephthalic acid (data page)
- Except where otherwise noted, data are given for materials in their standard state (at 25 °C [77 °F], 100 kPa). verify (what is ?) Infobox references

Terephthalic acid is an organic compound with the molecular formula C_{8}H_{6}O_{4}, a dicarboxylic acid with a benzene core. The two acids are para to each other; the other possible constitutional isomers are phthalic acid (ortho) and isophthalic acid (meta). This white solid is a commodity chemical, used principally as a precursor to polyethylene terephthalate (PET), a polyester used to make clothing and plastic bottles. Several million tons are produced annually.

The common name is derived from the turpentine-producing tree Pistacia terebinthus and phthalic acid.

Terephthalic acid is also used in the production of polybutylene terephthalate (PBT).

== History ==
Terephthalic acid was first isolated (from turpentine) by the French chemist Amédée Cailliot (1805–1884) in 1846. It became industrially important after World War II. It was produced by oxidation of p-xylene with 30-40% nitric acid. Air oxidation of p-xylene gives p-toluic acid, which resists further air-oxidation. Esterification of p-toluic acid to methyl p-toluate (CH_{3}C_{6}H_{4}CO_{2}CH_{3}) opens the way for further oxidation to monomethyl terephthalate.

In the Dynamit−Nobel process these two oxidations and the esterification were performed in a single reactor. The reaction conditions also lead to a second esterification, producing dimethyl terephthalate, which could be hydrolysed to terephthalic acid.

In 1955, Mid-Century Corporation and ICI announced the bromide-catalysed oxidation of p-toluic acid directly to terephthalic acid, without the need to isolate intermediates and still using air as the oxidant. Amoco (as Standard Oil of Indiana) purchased the Mid-Century/ICI technology, and the process is now known by their name.

== Synthesis ==
=== Amoco process ===
In the Amoco process, which is widely adopted worldwide, terephthalic acid is produced by catalytic oxidation of p-xylene:

The process uses a cobalt–manganese–bromide catalyst. The bromide source can be sodium bromide, hydrogen bromide, or tetrabromoethane. Bromine functions as a regenerative source of free radicals. Acetic acid is the solvent and compressed air serves as the oxidant. The combination of bromine and acetic acid is highly corrosive, requiring specialized reactors, such as those lined with titanium. A mixture of p-xylene, acetic acid, the catalyst system, and compressed air is fed to a reactor.

==== Mechanism ====
The oxidation of p-xylene proceeds by a free radical process. Bromine radicals decompose cobalt and manganese hydroperoxides. The resulting oxygen-based radicals abstract hydrogen from a methyl group, which have weaker C−H bonds than does the aromatic ring. Many intermediates have been isolated. p-xylene is converted to p-toluic acid, which is less reactive than the p-xylene owing to the influence of the electron-withdrawing carboxylic acid group. Incomplete oxidation produces 4-carboxybenzaldehyde (4-CBA), which is often a problematic impurity.

==== Challenges ====
Approximately 5% of the acetic acid solvent is lost by decomposition or "burning". Product loss by decarboxylation to benzoic acid is common. The high temperature diminishes oxygen solubility in an already oxygen-starved system. Pure oxygen cannot be used in the traditional system due to hazards of flammable organic–O_{2} mixtures. Atmospheric air can be used in its place, but once reacted needs to be purified of toxins and ozone depleters such as methylbromide before being released. Additionally, the corrosive nature of bromides at high temperatures requires the reaction be run in expensive titanium reactors.

==== Alternative reaction media ====
The use of carbon dioxide overcomes many of the problems with the original industrial process. Because CO_{2} is a better flame inhibitor than N_{2}, a CO_{2} environment allows for the use of pure oxygen directly, instead of air, with reduced flammability hazards. The solubility of molecular oxygen in solution is also enhanced in the CO_{2} environment. Because more oxygen is available to the system, supercritical carbon dioxide (T_{c} = 31 °C (88 °F)) has more complete oxidation with fewer byproducts, lower carbon monoxide production, less decarboxylation, and higher purity than the commercial process.

In supercritical water medium, the oxidation can be effectively catalyzed by MnBr_{2} with pure O_{2} at a medium-high temperature. Use of supercritical water instead of acetic acid as a solvent diminishes environmental impact and offers a cost advantage. However, the scope of such reaction systems is limited by the even more demanding conditions than the industrial process (300–400 °C (572–752 °F), >200 bar (20,000 kPa)).

=== Promotors and additives ===
As with any large-scale process, many additives have been investigated for potential beneficial effects. Promising results have been reported with the following:

- Ketones act as promoters for formation of the active cobalt(III) catalyst. In particular, ketones with α-methylene groups oxidize to hydroperoxides that are known to oxidize cobalt(II). Butanone is often used.
- Zirconium salts enhance the activity of Co-Mn-Br catalysts. Selectivity is also improved.
- N-Hydroxyphthalimide is a potential replacement for bromide, which is highly corrosive. The phthalimide functions by formation of the oxyl radical, −O^{•}.
- Guanidine inhibits the oxidation of the first methyl but enhances the usually slow oxidation of the toluic acid.

=== Alternative routes ===
Terephthalic acid can also be made from toluene by the Gattermann-Koch reaction, which gives 4-methylbenzaldehyde. Oxidation of the latter gives terephthalic acid.

Terephthalic acid can be prepared in the laboratory by oxidizing many para-disubstituted derivatives of benzene, including caraway oil or a mixture of cymene and cuminol, with chromic acid.

Although not commercially significant, there is also the so-called "Henkel process" or "Raecke process", named after the company and patent holder, respectively. This route involves the transfer of carboxylate groups. Either potassium benzoate disproportionates to potassium terephthalate and benzene or potassium phthalate rearranges to the terephthalate. Phthalic anhydride can be used as a raw material and then potassium can be recycled.

== Applications ==
Virtually the entire world's supply of terephthalic acid and dimethyl terephthalate are consumed as precursors to polyethylene terephthalate (PET). A smaller, but nevertheless significant, demand for terephthalic acid exists in the production of polybutylene terephthalate and several other engineering polymers. Kevlar is a polyamide derived from terephthalic acid. Poly(ester amide)s are another class of polymers that have novel properties.

=== Other uses ===
- As a raw material to make plasticizers such as dioctyl terephthalate and dibutyl terephthalate.
- In the pharmaceutical industry as a raw material for certain drugs.
- As a component for the synthesis of metal-organic frameworks.
- To form terepthalate salts of certain drug freebases, such as oxycodone.
- As the primary obscurant in some military smoke grenades, most notably the American M83 smoke grenade and M90 vehicle-employed smoke grenade, producing a thick white smoke (the result of vaporized terepthalic acid recondensing). It acts as an obscurant in the visual and near-infrared spectrum.

== Biodegradation ==
In Comamonas thiooxydans strain E6, terephthalic acid is biodegraded to protocatechuic acid, a common natural product, via a reaction pathway initiated by terephthalate 1,2-dioxygenase. Combined with the previously known PETase and MHETase, a full pathway for PET plastic degradation can be engineered.
