= Phthalic acid =

Aromatic organic compound with formula C6H4(COOH)2

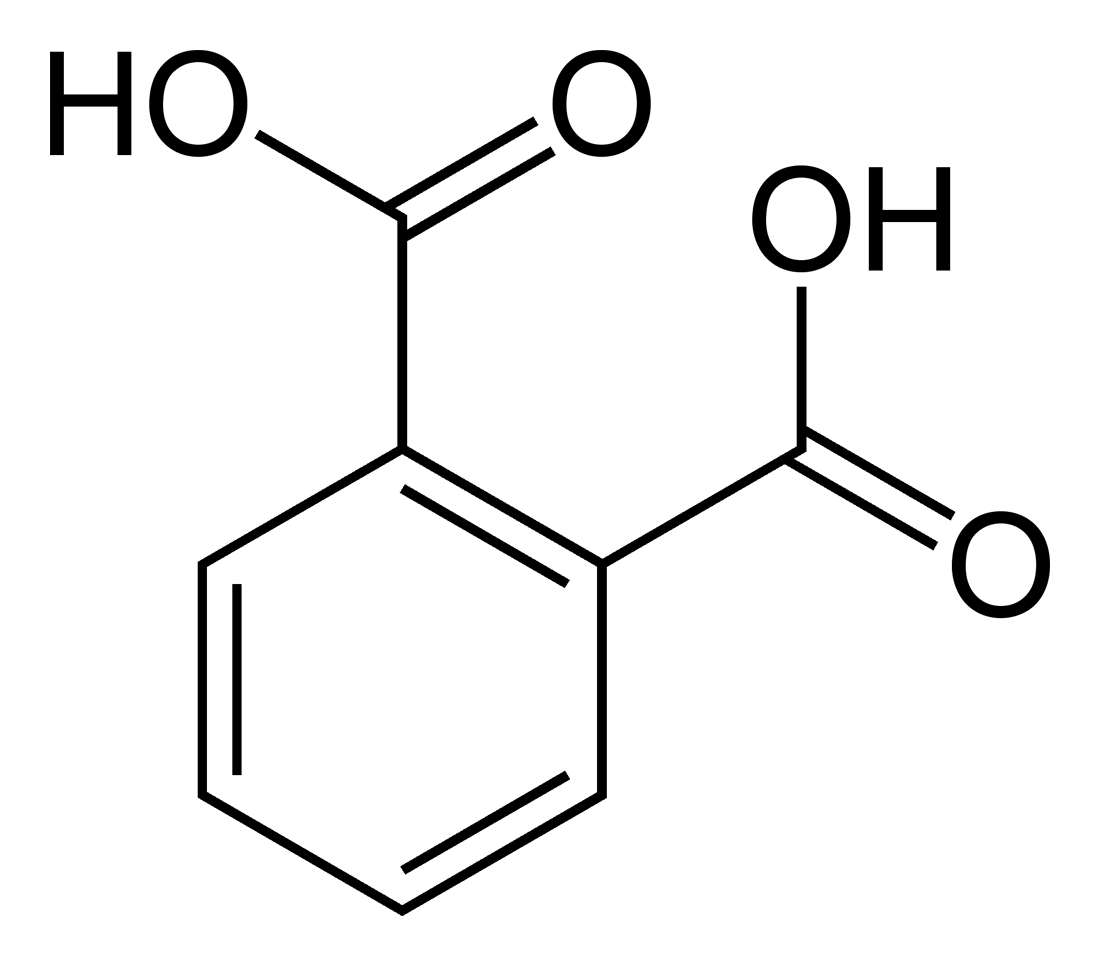
- Phthalic acids

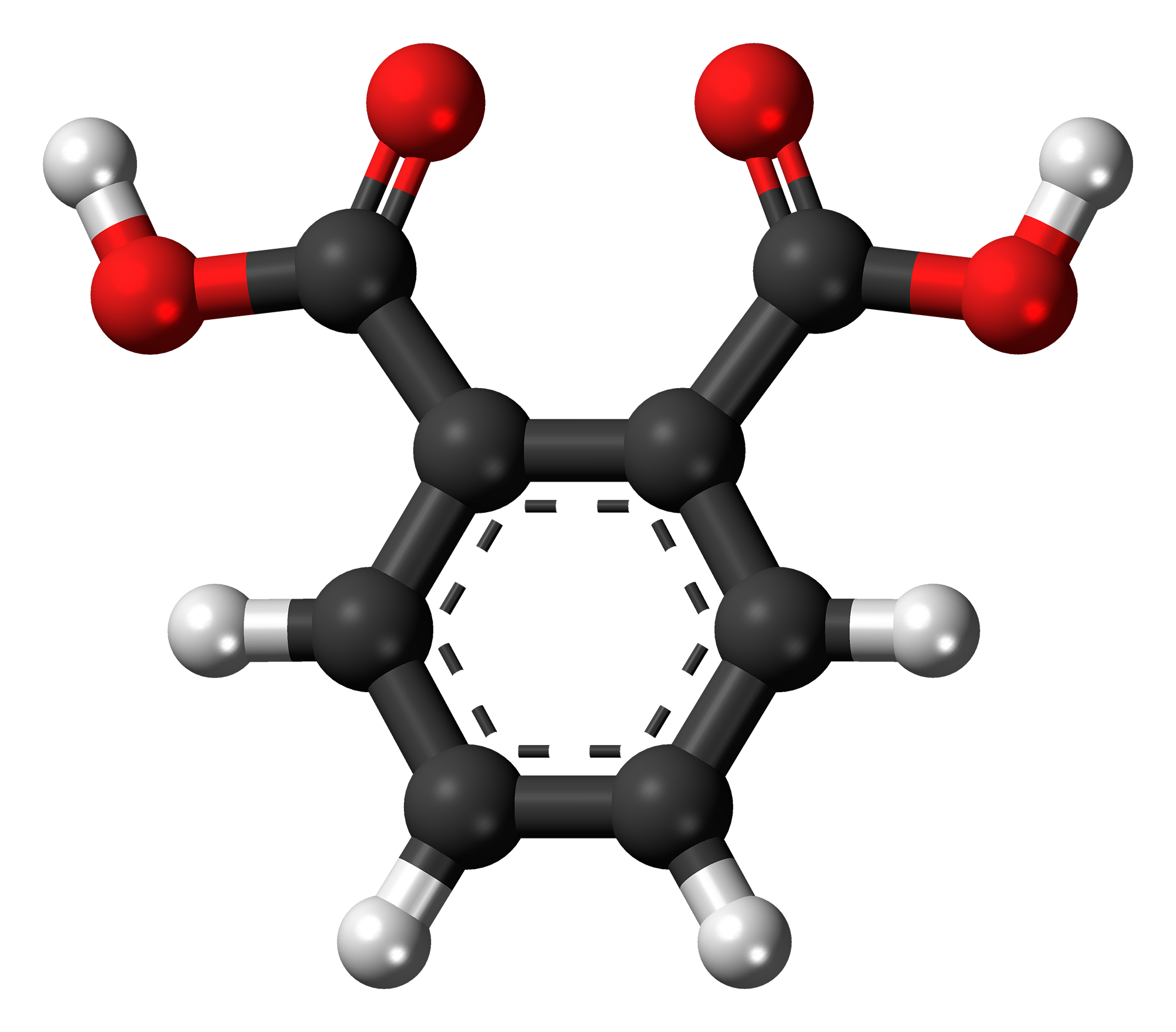

Names
- Preferred IUPAC name Benzene-1,2-dicarboxylic acid
- Other names 1,2-Benzenedioic acid Phthalic acid Benzene-1,2-dioic acid ortho-Phthalic acid

Identifiers
CAS Number	88-99-3
3D model (JSmol)	Interactive image
ChEBI	CHEBI:29069
ChemSpider	992
ECHA InfoCard	100.001.703
EC Number	201-873-2
PubChem CID	1017
UNII	6O7F7IX66E
CompTox Dashboard (EPA)	DTXSID8021484
- InChI: InChI=1S/C8H6O4/c9-7(10)5-3-1-2-4-6(5)8(11)12/h1-4H,(H,9,10)(H,11,12) Key: XNGIFLGASWRNHJ-UHFFFAOYSA-N; InChI=1/C8H6O4/c9-7(10)5-3-1-2-4-6(5)8(11)12/h1-4H,(H,9,10)(H,11,12) Key: XNGIFLGASWRNHJ-UHFFFAOYAX
- SMILES: OC(=O)c1ccccc1C(=O)O

Properties
Chemical formula	C_{8}H_{6}O_{4}
Molar mass	166.132 g/mol
Appearance	white solid
Density	1.593 g/cm^{3}, solid
Melting point	207 °C (405 °F; 480 K)
Solubility in water	0.6 g / 100 mL
Acidity (pK_{a})	2.89, 5.51
Magnetic susceptibility (χ)	−83.61·10^{−6} cm^{3}/mol

Hazards
- GHS labelling
Pictograms	(GHS05: Corrosive) (GHS07: Exclamation mark)
Signal word	Danger
Hazard statements	H315, H318, H319, H335
Precautionary statements	P261, P264, P264+P265, P271, P280, P302+P352, P304+P340, P305+P351+P338, P305+P354+P338, P317, P319, P321, P332+P317, P337+P317, P362+P364, P403+P233, P405, P501
NFPA 704 (fire diamond)	2 0 0

Related compounds
Related carboxylic acids	Isophthalic acid Terephthalic acid
Related compounds	Phthalic anhydride Phthalimide; Phthalhydrazide; Phthaloyl chloride Benzene-1,2- dicarboxaldehyde
- Except where otherwise noted, data are given for materials in their standard state (at 25 °C [77 °F], 100 kPa). verify (what is ?) Infobox references

In organic chemistry, phthalic acid (θ|æ|l|ɪ|k|/ THAL-ik) is an aromatic dicarboxylic acid, with formula C_{6}H_{4}(CO_{2}H)_{2} and structure HO(O)C−C_{6}H_{4}−C(O)OH. Although phthalic acid is of modest commercial importance, the closely related derivative phthalic anhydride is a commodity chemical produced on a large scale. Phthalic acid is one of three isomers of benzenedicarboxylic acid, the others being isophthalic acid and terephthalic acid.

== Production ==
Phthalic acid is produced by the catalytic oxidation of naphthalene or ortho-xylene directly to phthalic anhydride and a subsequent hydrolysis of the anhydride.

Phthalic acid was first obtained by French chemist Auguste Laurent in 1836 by oxidizing naphthalene tetrachloride. Believing the resulting substance to be a naphthalene derivative, he named it "naphthalic acid". After the Swiss chemist Jean Charles Galissard de Marignac determined its correct formula, Laurent gave it its present name. Manufacturing methods in the nineteenth century included oxidation of naphthalene tetrachloride with nitric acid, or, better, oxidation of the hydrocarbon with fuming sulfuric acid, using mercury or mercury(II) sulfate as a catalyst.

== Synthesis ==
Naphthalene, on oxidation with potassium permanganate or potassium dichromate, gives phthalic anhydride, which, through hydrolysis with hot water, gives phthalic acid. A more standard procedure is to oxidize napthalene with air, but this reaction proceeds explosively unless conditions are set up very accurately.

== Uses ==
Phthalic acid in the form of phthalic anhydride is an important industrial chemical, used for making phthalates (esters of phthalic acid) that are used as plasticizers. However, phthalic anhydride is usually not made by dehydration of phthalic acid but from o-xylene or naphthalene.

== Reactions ==
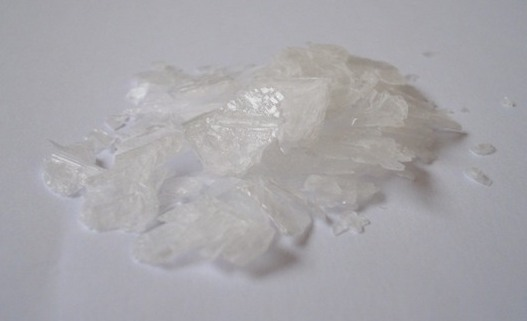
Phthalic acid crystals

It is a dibasic acid, with pK_{a}s of 2.89 and 5.51. The monopotassium salt, potassium hydrogen phthalate is a standard acid in analytical chemistry. Phthalate esters are typically prepared from the widely available phthalic anhydride. Reduction of phthalic acid with sodium amalgam in the presence of water gives the 1,3-cyclohexadiene derivative.

== Safety ==
The toxicity of phthalic acid is moderate with LD_{50} (mouse) of 550 mg/kg.

== Biodegradation ==
The bacteria Pseudomonas sp. P1 degrades phthalic acid.

== See also ==
- Isophthalic acid
- Phthalate
- Phthalic anhydride
- Potassium hydrogen phthalate, a primary standard for acid–base titrations
- Terephthalic acid
