= C8H8O2 =

The molecular formula C_{8}H_{8}O_{2} may refer to:

- Anisaldehyde (p-anisaldehyde)
- Benzodioxan
- 3,4-Dihydroxystyrene
- 3-Hydroxyacetophenone
- 2-Hydroxy-4-methylbenzaldehyde
- 4-Hydroxyphenylacetaldehyde
- 2-Methoxybenzaldehyde (o-anisaldehyde)
- Methyl benzoate
- Phenyl acetate
- Phenylacetic acid
- Piceol and other hydroxy acetophenones
- Toluic acids
  - p-Toluic acid
  - o-Toluic acid
  - m-Toluic acid
