= Chrysothamnus molestus =

Conservation status
- Vulnerable (NatureServe)

Scientific classification
- Kingdom: Plantae
- Clade: Tracheophytes
- Clade: Angiosperms
- Clade: Eudicots
- Clade: Asterids
- Order: Asterales
- Family: Asteraceae
- Genus: Chrysothamnus
- Species: C. molestus

Binomial name
- Chrysothamnus molestus (S.F.Blake) L.C.Anderson

Synonyms
- Chrysothamnus viscidiflorus var. molestus S.F.Blake; Ericameria molesta (S.F.Blake) L.C.Anderson

Species of flowering plant

Chrysothamnus molestus is a species of flowering plant in the family Asteraceae known by the common names Arizona rabbitbrush, Tusayan rabbitbrush, disturbed rabbitbrush, and stickyfruit low rabbitbrush. It is endemic to the State of Arizona in the southwestern United States, where it is known from Coconino, Apache, and Navajo Counties.

This plant is a low shrub or subshrub up to about 20 centimeters high, growing from a woody, branching caudex. The plants are often cropped low by grazing animals. The bark on the woody part is dark gray and fibrous, and the stems are green and glandular. The leaves are up to 2 centimeters long and under 2 millimeters wide. The blades are hairy and glandular. The inflorescence is an array of nearly cylindrical flower heads each containing five yellow disc florets but no ray florets. Many flowers are produced after times of stress. Blooming typically occurs in August through October. The fruit is over a centimeter long including its pappus.

This is the only Chrysothamnus endemic to Arizona. One population is located between the rim of the Grand Canyon and Flagstaff, and the others are within the Navajo Nation. The habitat is pinyon-juniper grassland, almost always with limestone soils. Associated plants include Artemisia tridentata (big sagebrush), Atriplex canescens (four-wing saltbush), Berberis fremontii (barberry), Bouteloua gracilis (blue grama), Krascheninnikovia lanata (winterfat), Chrysothamnus depressus (dwarf rabbitbrush), C. greenei (Greene rabbit-bush), C. viscidiflorus (sticky-leaf rabbit-brush), Gutierrezia sarothrae (broom snakeweed), Koeleria pyramidata (junegrass), Juniperus sp. (juniper), Oryzopsis hymenoides (Indian mountain-ricegrass), Pinus sp. (pine), Poa fendleriana (muttongrass), Purshia stansburiana (Stansbury cliffrose), Quercus gambelii (Gambel oak), and Tetradymia sp. (horsebush).

Threats to this species include grazing by livestock such as cattle and by wildlife such as elk. Another threat is low recruitment. The reason for this is not well known.
