= Toluic acid =

Toluic acid, also known as toluylic acid or methylbenzoic acid, is an organic compound and a carboxylic acid derivative of toluene.

Toluic acid may refer to the following isomers:

- o-Toluic acid
- m-Toluic acid
- p-Toluic acid
