= Hydroxyacetophenone =

Hydroxyacetophenone may refer to:

- 2-Hydroxyacetophenone (o-hydroxyacetophenone)
- 3-Hydroxyacetophenone (m-hydroxyacetophenone)
- 4-Hydroxyacetophenone (p-hydroxyacetophenone, piceol)
