= C14H18O8 =

The molecular formula C_{14}H_{18}O_{8} may refer to:

- Glucovanillin
- Pungenin
