= Prolita thaliae =

Scientific classification
- Kingdom: Animalia
- Phylum: Arthropoda
- Clade: Pancrustacea
- Class: Insecta
- Order: Lepidoptera
- Family: Gelechiidae
- Genus: Prolita
- Species: P. thaliae

Binomial name
- Prolita thaliae (Hodges, 1966)

Synonyms
- Lita thaliae Hodges, 1966

Species of moth

Prolita thaliae is a moth of the family Gelechiidae. It was described by Ronald W. Hodges in 1966. It is found in North America, where it has been recorded from California, Colorado, Utah and Wyoming.

The wingspan is 19-20.5 mm. The forewings are off white, pale buff, pale yellow, and brown with the ridges of many scales white or off white. The hindwings are pale fuscous, with the veins and costal margin shining pale orange.

The larvae feed on Chrysothamnus nauseosus.
