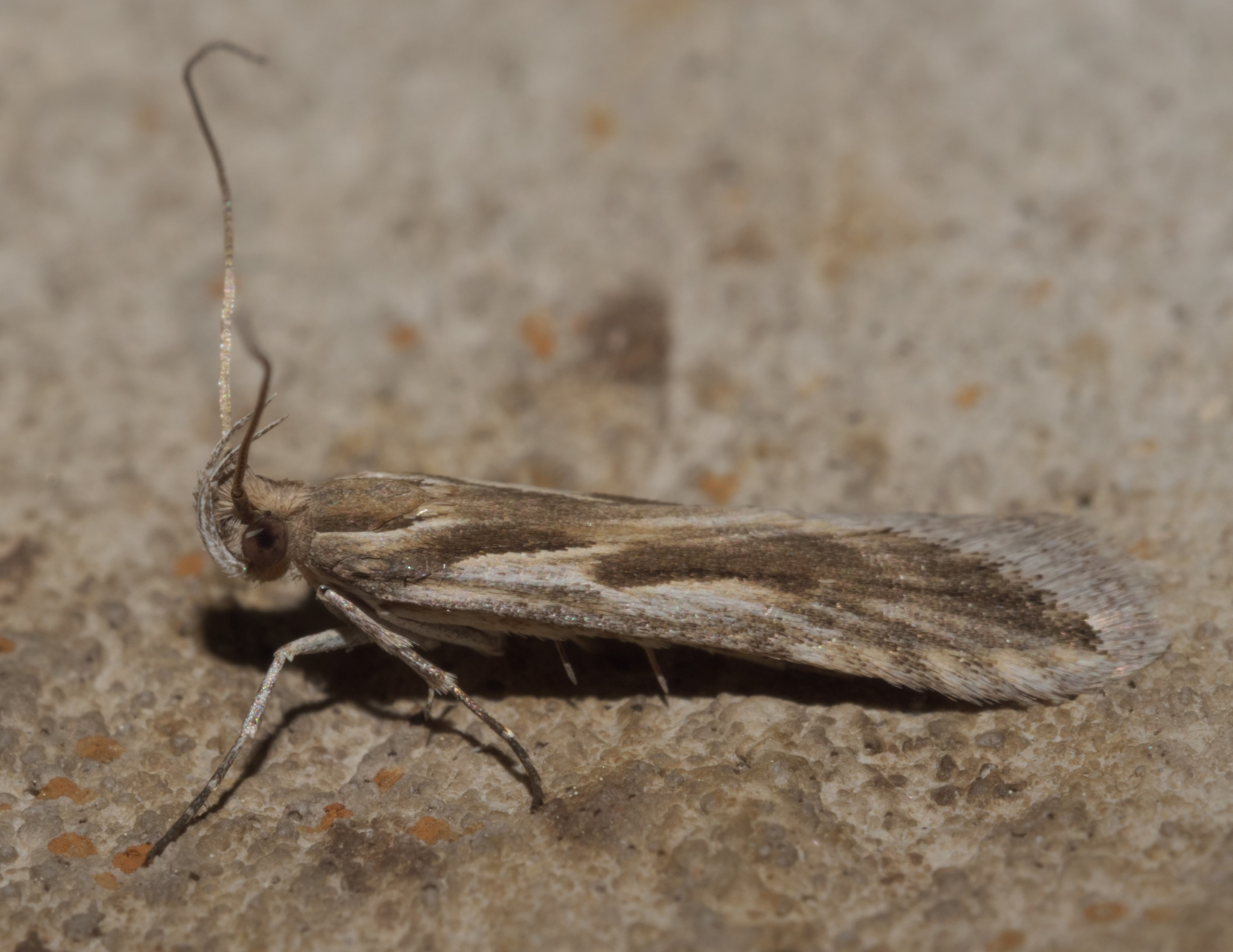
- Prolita jubata, Wyoming

Scientific classification
- Kingdom: Animalia
- Phylum: Arthropoda
- Clade: Pancrustacea
- Class: Insecta
- Order: Lepidoptera
- Family: Gelechiidae
- Genus: Prolita
- Species: P. jubata

Binomial name
- Prolita jubata (Hodges, 1966)

Synonyms
- Lita jubata Hodges, 1966

= Prolita jubata =

Species of moth

Prolita jubata is a moth of the family Gelechiidae. It was described by Ronald W. Hodges in 1966. It is found in North America, where it has been recorded from Washington, California, Colorado, Idaho, Montana and Utah.

The wingspan is 16–20 mm.

The larvae feed on Chrysothamnus viscidiflorus.
