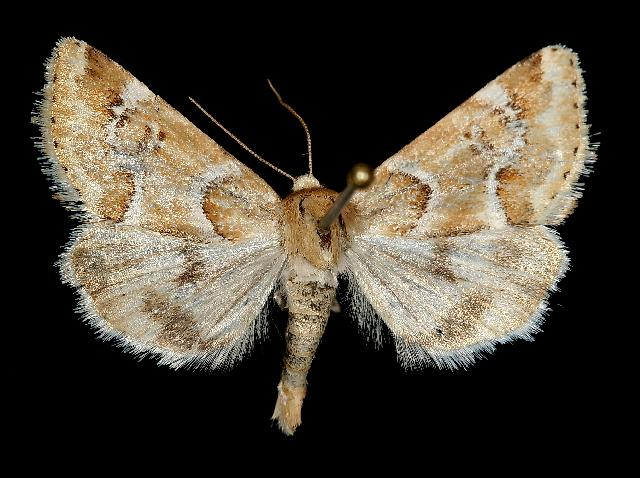

Scientific classification
- Kingdom: Animalia
- Phylum: Arthropoda
- Class: Insecta
- Order: Lepidoptera
- Superfamily: Noctuoidea
- Family: Noctuidae
- Genus: Schinia
- Species: S. walsinghami

Binomial name
- Schinia walsinghami H. Edwards, 1881

Synonyms
- Schinia balba Grote, 1881; Schinia brucei Smith, 1891

= Schinia walsinghami =

Species of moth

Schinia walsinghami is a moth of the family Noctuidae. It is found from British Columbia south to California.

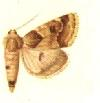

The wingspan is about 24 mm. Adults fly in late summer.

The larvae feed on Chrysothamnus and Ericameria species.
