= Prolita nefrens =

Scientific classification
- Kingdom: Animalia
- Phylum: Arthropoda
- Clade: Pancrustacea
- Class: Insecta
- Order: Lepidoptera
- Family: Gelechiidae
- Genus: Prolita
- Species: P. nefrens

Binomial name
- Prolita nefrens (Hodges, 1966)

Synonyms
- Lita nefrens Hodges, 1966

Species of moth

Prolita nefrens is a moth of the family Gelechiidae. It was described by Ronald W. Hodges in 1966. It is found in North America, where it has been recorded from California, New Mexico, Nevada, Washington, Wyoming and Colorado.

The wingspan is 15–22 mm. The forewings are brown, many scales with buff streaks and with the light streaks white, buff white or buff. The hindwings are fuscous with pale ocher reflections.

The larvae feed on Chrysothamnus nauseosus.
