= Picein =

- Chemical structure of picein

Names
- IUPAC name 1-[4-(β-D-Glucopyranosyloxy)phenyl]ethan-1-one
- Systematic IUPAC name 1-(4-{[(2S,3R,4S,5S,6R)-3,4,5-Trihydroxy-6-(hydroxymethyl)oxan-2-yl]oxy}phenyl)ethan-1-one
- Other names L-Picein; Ameliaroside

Identifiers
CAS Number	530-14-3
3D model (JSmol)	Interactive image
Abbreviations	Glc(b)-O-Ph(4-Ac)
ChemSpider	83169
ECHA InfoCard	100.007.704
PubChem CID	92123
UNII	2H3ACT49CQ
CompTox Dashboard (EPA)	DTXSID201031535
- InChI: InChI=1S/C14H18O7/c1-7(16)8-2-4-9(5-3-8)20-14-13(19)12(18)11(17)10(6-15) 21-14/h2-5,10-15,17-19H,6H2,1H3/t10-,11-,12+,13-,14-/m1/s1 Key: GOZCEKPKECLKNO-RKQHYHRCSA-N
- SMILES: CC(=O)C1=CC=C(C=C1)O[C@H]2[C@@H]([C@H]([C@@H]([C@H](O2)CO)O)O)O

Properties
Chemical formula	C_{14}H_{18}O_{7}
Molar mass	298.291 g·mol^{−1}
- Except where otherwise noted, data are given for materials in their standard state (at 25 °C [77 °F], 100 kPa). Infobox references

Picein is a phenolic compound found in mycorrhizal roots of Norway spruces (Picea abies). It is the glucoside of piceol.

== See also ==
- Pungenin
