= Prolita obnubila =

Scientific classification
- Kingdom: Animalia
- Phylum: Arthropoda
- Clade: Pancrustacea
- Class: Insecta
- Order: Lepidoptera
- Family: Gelechiidae
- Genus: Prolita
- Species: P. obnubila

Binomial name
- Prolita obnubila (Hodges, 1966)

Synonyms
- Lita obnubila Hodges, 1966

Species of moth

Prolita obnubila is a moth of the family Gelechiidae. It was described by Ronald W. Hodges in 1966. It is found in North America, where it has been recorded from Texas.

The wingspan is 19–23 mm. The forewings are white, buff white, pale yellow, red brown, and brown, with many scales of the cilia tipped with red brown. The hindwings are fuscous, with the veins broadly covered with scales that appear shining orange at some angles of light incidence.
