= Prolita deoia =

Scientific classification
- Kingdom: Animalia
- Phylum: Arthropoda
- Clade: Pancrustacea
- Class: Insecta
- Order: Lepidoptera
- Family: Gelechiidae
- Genus: Prolita
- Species: P. deoia

Binomial name
- Prolita deoia (Hodges, 1966)

Synonyms
- Lita deoia Hodges, 1966

Species of moth

Prolita deoia is a moth of the family Gelechiidae. It was described by Ronald W. Hodges in 1966. It is found in North America, where it has been recorded from California.

The wingspan is about 22.5 mm. The forewings are buff white, tinged with pale yellow and brown, and with the dark markings brown. The hindwings are shining pale fuscous, with the veins slightly darker.
