= Methyl p-toluate =

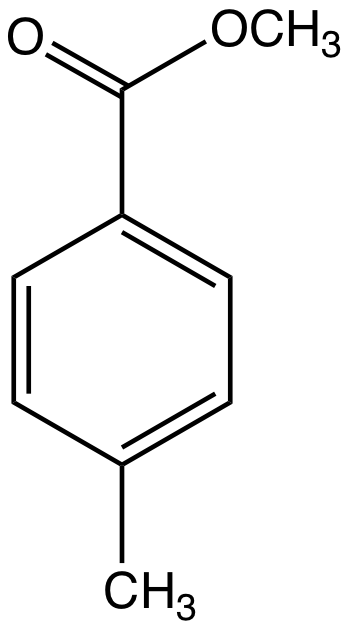

Names
- Preferred IUPAC name Methyl 4-methylbenzoate

Identifiers
CAS Number	99-75-2
3D model (JSmol)	Interactive image
ChEMBL	ChEMBL1480173
ChemSpider	7175
ECHA InfoCard	100.002.531
EC Number	202-784-1
PubChem CID	7455
UNII	964JP0ZZRG
CompTox Dashboard (EPA)	DTXSID4025668
- InChI: InChI=1S/C9H10O2/c1-7-3-5-8(6-4-7)9(10)11-2/h3-6H,1-2H3 Key: QSSJZLPUHJDYKF-UHFFFAOYSA-N
- SMILES: CC1=CC=C(C=C1)C(=O)OC

Properties
Chemical formula	C_{9}H_{10}O_{2}
Molar mass	150.177 g·mol^{−1}
Appearance	White solid
Density	1.058
Melting point	32–35 °C (90–95 °F; 305–308 K)
Boiling point	222.4

Hazards
- GHS labelling
Pictograms	(GHS05: Corrosive) (GHS07: Exclamation mark)
Signal word	Danger
Hazard statements	H315, H317, H318, H319, H335
Precautionary statements	P261, P264, P271, P272, P280, P302+P352, P304+P340, P305+P351+P338, P310, P312, P321, P332+P313, P333+P313, P337+P313, P362, P363, P403+P233, P405, P501
Flash point	95.5 °C (203.9 °F; 368.6 K)
- Except where otherwise noted, data are given for materials in their standard state (at 25 °C [77 °F], 100 kPa). Infobox references

Methyl p-toluate is the organic compound with the formula CH_{3}C_{6}H_{4}CO_{2}CH_{3}. It is a waxy white solid that is soluble in common organic solvents. It is the methyl ester of p-toluic acid. Methyl p-toluate per se is not particularly important but is an intermediate in some routes to dimethyl terephthalate, a commodity chemical.
