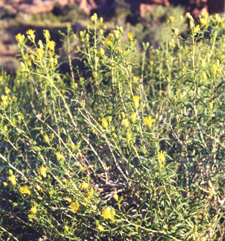

Scientific classification
- Kingdom: Plantae
- Clade: Embryophytes
- Clade: Tracheophytes
- Clade: Angiosperms
- Clade: Eudicots
- Clade: Asterids
- Order: Asterales
- Family: Asteraceae
- Genus: Chrysothamnus
- Species: C. stylosus

Binomial name
- Chrysothamnus stylosus (Eastw.) Urbatsch, R.P.Roberts & Neubig

Synonyms
- Grindelia stylosa Eastw.; Vanclevea stylosa (Eastw.) Greene

= Chrysothamnus stylosus =

Species of flowering plant

Chrysothamnus stylosus, called pillar false gumweed, or resinbush, is a species of flowering plants in the tribe Astereae within the family Asteraceae. It is native to Arizona and Utah in the southwestern United States.

Chrysothamnus stylosus is a shrub up to 120 cm (48 inches) tall with bark that tends to turn gray and flaky when it gets old. Flower heads are yellow, usually produced in dense arrays of many heads. The species grows on sandy soil in canyonlands and open woodlands.
