= Prolita dialis =

Scientific classification
- Kingdom: Animalia
- Phylum: Arthropoda
- Clade: Pancrustacea
- Class: Insecta
- Order: Lepidoptera
- Family: Gelechiidae
- Genus: Prolita
- Species: P. dialis

Binomial name
- Prolita dialis (Hodges, 1966)

Synonyms
- Lita dialis Hodges, 1966

Species of moth

Prolita dialis is a moth of the family Gelechiidae. It was described by Ronald W. Hodges in 1966. It is found in North America, where it has been recorded from Arizona, New Mexico, Texas and Mexico.

The wingspan is 17.5–20 mm. The forewings are buff white to buff, with a dark brown spot. The hindwings are shining pale fuscous, with the veins darker and tinged with yellow gray.
