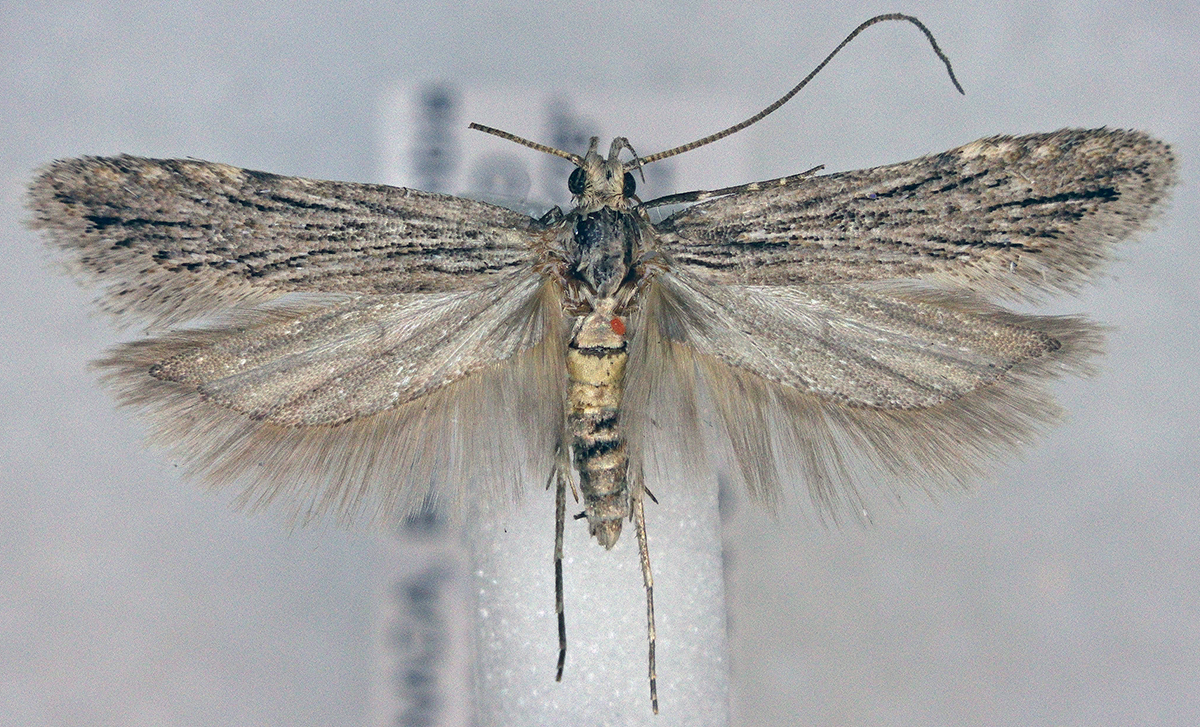

Scientific classification
- Domain: Eukaryota
- Kingdom: Animalia
- Phylum: Arthropoda
- Class: Insecta
- Order: Lepidoptera
- Family: Gelechiidae
- Genus: Prolita
- Species: P. rectistrigella

Binomial name
- Prolita rectistrigella (Barnes & Busck, 1920)

Synonyms
- Gelechia rectistrigella Barnes & Busck, 1920; Lita rectistrigella

= Prolita rectistrigella =

Species of moth

Prolita rectistrigella is a species of moth in the family Gelechiidae. It was first described by William Barnes and August Busck in 1920. It is found in North America, where it has been recorded from California, Arizona, New Mexico, Colorado, Utah, Wyoming, Montana, Washington and Alberta.

== Description ==
The wingspan is 17-20.5 mm. There are streaks of gray white between brown on the veins of the forewings and the outer margin has dark brown at the ends of the veins. The scales of the cilia are gray white, the apex of each scale pale brown. The hindwings are fuscous.
