= Prolita incicur =

Scientific classification
- Kingdom: Animalia
- Phylum: Arthropoda
- Clade: Pancrustacea
- Class: Insecta
- Order: Lepidoptera
- Family: Gelechiidae
- Genus: Prolita
- Species: P. incicur

Binomial name
- Prolita incicur (Hodges, 1966)

Synonyms
- Lita incicur Hodges, 1966

Species of moth

Prolita incicur is a moth of the family Gelechiidae. It was described by Ronald W. Hodges in 1966. It is found in North America, where it has been recorded from California, Nevada, Wyoming, Oregon and Colorado.

The wingspan is 17–27 mm. The forewings are pale buff to orange with the dark markings brown. The hindwings are shining fuscous, with the veins orange brown.
