= Prolita recens =

Scientific classification
- Kingdom: Animalia
- Phylum: Arthropoda
- Clade: Pancrustacea
- Class: Insecta
- Order: Lepidoptera
- Family: Gelechiidae
- Genus: Prolita
- Species: P. recens

Binomial name
- Prolita recens (Hodges, 1966)

Synonyms
- Lita recens Hodges, 1966

Species of moth

Prolita recens is a moth of the family Gelechiidae. It was described by Ronald W. Hodges in 1966. It is found in North America, where it has been recorded from California, Colorado, Montana, New Mexico, Washington and British Columbia.

The wingspan is 17–22 mm. The scales on the forewings are white, buff white, pale yellow, brown, and dark brown, many scales with apices and many scales streaked with a second color. The hindwings are fuscous, the scales shining orange at certain angles of light incidence and the veins are somewhat darker.

The larvae feed on Stenatopsis linearifolius and Ericameria cuneata.
