= Prolita variabilis =

Scientific classification
- Domain: Eukaryota
- Kingdom: Animalia
- Phylum: Arthropoda
- Class: Insecta
- Order: Lepidoptera
- Family: Gelechiidae
- Genus: Prolita
- Species: P. variabilis

Binomial name
- Prolita variabilis (Busck, 1903)

Synonyms
- Gelechia variabilis Busck, 1903; Lita variabilis

Species of moth

Prolita variabilis is a moth of the family Gelechiidae. It was described by August Busck in 1903. It is found in North America, where it has been recorded from California, Colorado, Arizona, Connecticut, Massachusetts, Montana, Nevada, New Mexico, Washington, British Columbia, Manitoba and Saskatchewan.

The wingspan is 22–27 mm. The forewings are light greyish yellow, slightly brownish toward the tip and with blackish brown longitudinal lines from the base to the apex, following the veins and becoming heavier and more blackish toward the apex. Three short more pronounced heavy black longitudinal lines independent of the others are very conspicuous and are found, although modified, in all the varieties. The first and shortest at the base just within the dorsal margin, the second on the fold, also starting more or less clearly from the base, but reaching its characteristic thickness and tone outside the first line and ending as a heavy line just before the middle of the wing, though after continued as one of the general thin lines to the dorsal apical edge. The third line is midway between the fold and the costal edge and begins at the middle of the wing and reaches to the end of the cell, also continued as one of the fainter lines from the base to the apex. The hindwings are yellowish fuscous.

The larvae have been reported feeding on Ericameria linearifolia.
