= Prolita texanella =

Scientific classification
- Kingdom: Animalia
- Phylum: Arthropoda
- Clade: Pancrustacea
- Class: Insecta
- Order: Lepidoptera
- Family: Gelechiidae
- Genus: Prolita
- Species: P. texanella

Binomial name
- Prolita texanella (Chambers, 1880)

Synonyms
- Anesychia texanella Chambers, 1880; Lita texanella; Ethmia chambersella Dyar, 1903

Species of moth

Prolita texanella is a moth of the family Gelechiidae. It was described by Vactor Tousey Chambers in 1880. It is found in North America, where it has been recorded from Texas and Mexico.

The wingspan is 21–27 mm. The scales of the thorax and forewings are buff white with brown apices and medial streaks. There are dark marks on the forewing, formed by scales with broad brown borders. The hindwings are fuscous.
