= Prolita maenadis =

Scientific classification
- Kingdom: Animalia
- Phylum: Arthropoda
- Clade: Pancrustacea
- Class: Insecta
- Order: Lepidoptera
- Family: Gelechiidae
- Genus: Prolita
- Species: P. maenadis

Binomial name
- Prolita maenadis (Hodges, 1966)

Synonyms
- Lita maenadis Hodges, 1966

Species of moth

Prolita maenadis is a moth of the family Gelechiidae. It was described by Ronald W. Hodges in 1966. It is found in North America, where it has been recorded from California.

The wingspan is 18–20 mm. The forewings are buff white to white, with several brown or red-brown tipped scales. The first row of scales of the cilia is brown tipped, the others unicolorous. The hindwings are pale fuscous, with the veins darker.

The larvae feed on Senecio species.
