= Prolita princeps =

Scientific classification
- Domain: Eukaryota
- Kingdom: Animalia
- Phylum: Arthropoda
- Class: Insecta
- Order: Lepidoptera
- Family: Gelechiidae
- Genus: Prolita
- Species: P. princeps

Binomial name
- Prolita princeps (Busck, 1910)

Synonyms
- Gnorimoschema princeps Busck, 1910; Lita princeps

Species of moth

Prolita princeps is a moth of the family Gelechiidae. It was described by August Busck in 1910. It is found in North America, where it has been recorded from California, Washington, Montana, Oregon, New Mexico, Utah and British Columbia.

The wingspan is 16.5–20 mm. The scales on the costal half at the base and the costal margin on the forewings are buff white with brown tips, while the scales on the area costad and distad of the medial brown streak are white to buff white with pale brown apices, and the scales dorsad of the brown streak are pale yellow. A few buff tipped scales are found on the outer margin. The hindwings are fuscous, with the veins slightly darker.
