= Prolita puertella =

Scientific classification
- Kingdom: Animalia
- Phylum: Arthropoda
- Clade: Pancrustacea
- Class: Insecta
- Order: Lepidoptera
- Family: Gelechiidae
- Genus: Prolita
- Species: P. puertella

Binomial name
- Prolita puertella (Busck, 1916)

Synonyms
- Gelechia puertella Busck, 1916; Lita puertella

Species of moth

Prolita puertella is a moth of the family Gelechiidae. It was first described by August Busck in 1916. They are found in North America, where reports have been recorded in Montana, California and Arizona. It has also been reported in Baja California.

The wingspan is 16–20 mm. The forewings are usually pale yellowish white with brown markings. The hindwings are pale fuscous yellow. However, it is a highly variable species, ranging from pale yellowish-white specimens with two prominent dark brown spots on the forewings to brown specimens with the dark brown spots barely discernible. Adults are on wing from August to October.

== Etymology ==
The species name refers to La Puerta, the type location.
