= Prolita pagella =

Scientific classification
- Kingdom: Animalia
- Phylum: Arthropoda
- Clade: Pancrustacea
- Class: Insecta
- Order: Lepidoptera
- Family: Gelechiidae
- Genus: Prolita
- Species: P. pagella

Binomial name
- Prolita pagella (Hodges, 1966)

Synonyms
- Lita pagella Hodges, 1966

Species of moth

Prolita pagella is a moth of the family Gelechiidae. It was described by Ronald W. Hodges in 1966. It is found in North America, where it has been recorded from Arizona, California, Wyoming and Colorado.

The wingspan is 17–19 mm. The forewings are orange brown and varying shades of brown. The hindwings are fuscous with dark veins.
