= Prolita invariabilis =

Scientific classification
- Domain: Eukaryota
- Kingdom: Animalia
- Phylum: Arthropoda
- Class: Insecta
- Order: Lepidoptera
- Family: Gelechiidae
- Genus: Prolita
- Species: P. invariabilis

Binomial name
- Prolita invariabilis (Kearfott, 1908)

Synonyms
- Gelechia invariabilis Kearfott, 1908; Lita invariabilis

Species of moth

Prolita invariabilis is a moth of the family Gelechiidae. It was described by William D. Kearfott in 1908. It is found in the US states of Utah, Wyoming, Arizona, California, Colorado, Oregon and New Mexico.

The wingspan is 18–22 mm. The costal margin of the forewings is brown intermixed with buff from the base to two-thirds. There is a broad pale buff band from near the base to three-fourths, margined dorsally by off-white. There is also a dark brown sinuous marking. The area dorsad of this line is fulvous and there is an off-white fascia at three-fourths followed by a mixture of dark brown, fulvous, and gray-brown scales. The hindwings are pale fuscous, the veins slightly darker.
