= Prolita barnesiella =

Scientific classification
- Domain: Eukaryota
- Kingdom: Animalia
- Phylum: Arthropoda
- Class: Insecta
- Order: Lepidoptera
- Family: Gelechiidae
- Genus: Prolita
- Species: P. barnesiella

Binomial name
- Prolita barnesiella (Busck, 1903)

Synonyms
- Gelechia barnesiella Busck, 1903; Lita barnesiella

Species of moth

Prolita barnesiella is a moth of the family Gelechiidae. It was described by August Busck in 1903. It is found in North America, where it has been recorded from California, Colorado, Arizona, New Mexico, Texas, Wyoming and Utah.

The wingspan is 22–27 mm. The forewings are brown, of a somewhat variable shade in different specimens, from a reddish or deep purple brown to a lighter ashy or yellowish brown. At the base of the costa is a dark blackish spot, sometimes continued into an obscure oblique streak across the wing. On the middle of the disc is a short oblique blackish streak, and just below this another similar but fainter streak, together forming an arrowhead pointing toward the tip of the wing. At the end of the disc is a short blackish streak edged with light scales. A little before the apical third is a large, dark, ill-defined costal spot and on the opposite on the dorsal edge is another similar spot. There is a series of blackish spots around the apical edge, with the intervening spaces rather lighter than the general colour of the wing. The hindwings are light silvery fuscous.
