= Prolita geniata =

Scientific classification
- Kingdom: Animalia
- Phylum: Arthropoda
- Clade: Pancrustacea
- Class: Insecta
- Order: Lepidoptera
- Family: Gelechiidae
- Genus: Prolita
- Species: P. geniata

Binomial name
- Prolita geniata (Hodges, 1966)

Synonyms
- Lita geniata Hodges, 1966

Species of moth

Prolita geniata is a moth of the family Gelechiidae. It was described by Ronald W. Hodges in 1966. It is found in North America, where it has been recorded from California and Nevada.

The wingspan is 15-19.5 mm. The forewings are varying shades of brown, but darker basally, becoming buff white apically, and with the spots on the disc dark brown, almost black. The hindwings are fuscous buff, with the veins more yellow orange.
