= Prolita solutella =

Scientific classification
- Kingdom: Animalia
- Phylum: Arthropoda
- Clade: Pancrustacea
- Class: Insecta
- Order: Lepidoptera
- Family: Gelechiidae
- Genus: Prolita
- Species: P. solutella

Binomial name
- Prolita solutella (Zeller, 1839)

Synonyms
- Gelechia solutella Zeller, 1839; Gelechia fumosella Douglas, 1852; Gelechia cornubiae Boyd, 1858; Gelechia pribitzeri Rebel, 1889; Gelechia solutella ab. cruttwelli Bankes, 1907; Gelechia nigrobipunctatella Lucas, 1932

Species of moth

Prolita solutella is a moth of the family Gelechiidae. It is widely distributed throughout Europe, east to the Ural Mountains. It is also found in Turkey. The habitat consists of dry pastures and dry heathland.

The wingspan is 16–21 mm.

The larvae feed on Genista angelica, Genista pilosa, Genista tinctoria, Genista scoparius, and Cytisus species. They live in a silken tube or tent.
