= Chrysothamnus humilis =

Scientific classification
- Kingdom: Plantae
- Clade: Tracheophytes
- Clade: Angiosperms
- Clade: Eudicots
- Clade: Asterids
- Order: Asterales
- Family: Asteraceae
- Genus: Chrysothamnus
- Species: C. humilis

Binomial name
- Chrysothamnus humilis Greene

Synonyms
- Chrysothamnus viscidiflorus var. humilis (Greene) Jeps.; Chrysothamnus viscidiflorus subsp. humilis (Greene) H.M.Hall & Clem.; Ericameria humilis (Greene) L.C.Anderson

Species of flowering plant

Chrysothamnus humilis, called Truckee rabbitbrush, is a North American species of flowering plants in the tribe Astereae within the family Asteraceae. It has been found in northern California, Oregon, Washington, northern Nevada, southwestern Idaho.

Chrysothamnus humilis is a branching shrub up to 30 cm (12 inches) tall with dark gray bark. It has many small, yellow flower heads clumped into dense arrays. The species grows in sagebrush scrub and in sand in desert regions.
