= Prolita sironae =

Scientific classification
- Kingdom: Animalia
- Phylum: Arthropoda
- Clade: Pancrustacea
- Class: Insecta
- Order: Lepidoptera
- Family: Gelechiidae
- Genus: Prolita
- Species: P. sironae

Binomial name
- Prolita sironae (Hodges, 1966)

Synonyms
- Lita sironae Hodges, 1966

Species of moth

Prolita sironae is a moth of the family Gelechiidae. It was described by Ronald W. Hodges in 1966. It is found in North America, where it has been recorded from California.

The wingspan is 14–17 mm. The forewings are streaked with white, buff white, pale yellow, brown, and black. The hindwings are fuscous with numerous orange scales.
