= Prolita veledae =

Scientific classification
- Kingdom: Animalia
- Phylum: Arthropoda
- Clade: Pancrustacea
- Class: Insecta
- Order: Lepidoptera
- Family: Gelechiidae
- Genus: Prolita
- Species: P. veledae

Binomial name
- Prolita veledae (Hodges, 1966)

Synonyms
- Lita veledae Hodges, 1966

Species of moth

Prolita veledae is a moth of the family Gelechiidae. It was described by Ronald W. Hodges in 1966. It is found in North America, where it has been recorded from California.

The wingspan is about 17 mm. The forewings are buff white to white, suffused with pale orange brown on the dorsal third and with a row of yellow scales on the outer margin. The hindwings are shining gray white.
