= Chrysothamnus scopulorum =

Scientific classification
- Kingdom: Plantae
- Clade: Tracheophytes
- Clade: Angiosperms
- Clade: Eudicots
- Clade: Asterids
- Order: Asterales
- Family: Asteraceae
- Genus: Chrysothamnus
- Species: C. scopulorum

Binomial name
- Chrysothamnus scopulorum (M.E. Jones) Urbatsch, R.P. Roberts & Neubig

Synonyms
- Bigelowia menziesii var. scopulorum M.E.Jones; Haplopappus scopulorum (M.E.Jones) S.F.Blake; Haplopappus scopulorum var. hirtellus S.F.Blake; Hesperodoria scopulorum (M.E.Jones) Greene; Isocoma scopulorum (M.E.Jones) Rydb.

Species of flowering plant

Chrysothamnus scopulorum, called Grand Canyon glowweed or evening-daisy , is a North American species of flowering plants in the tribe Astereae within the family Asteraceae. It has been found only in northern Arizona and southern Utah.

Chrysothamnus scopulorum is a branching shrub up to 100 cm (40 inches) tall with tan or gray bark, becoming flaky as it gets old. It has many small, yellow flower heads clumped into dense arrays. The species grows on mountain slopes alongside brush and Ponderosa pine.
