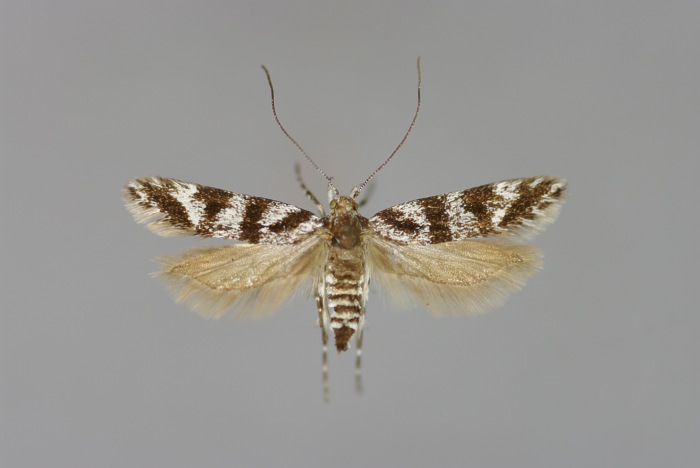

Scientific classification
- Kingdom: Animalia
- Phylum: Arthropoda
- Class: Insecta
- Order: Lepidoptera
- Family: Gelechiidae
- Genus: Prolita
- Species: P. sexpunctella

Binomial name
- Prolita sexpunctella (Fabricius, 1794)

Synonyms
- Tinea sexpunctella Fabricius, 1794; Tinea virgella Thunberg, 1794; Tinea histrionella Geyer, 1832; Lita zebrella Treitschke, 1833; Gelechia longicornella Doubleday, 1859; Gelechia longicornis var. alpicola Frey, 1867; Gelechia alternatella Kearfott, 1908; Gelechia petulans Braun, 1925; Gelechia longicornis Curtis, 1827; Gelechia virgella ab. melanica Strand, 1920; Lita longicornis (Curtis, 1827); Anacampsis longicornis (Curtis, 1827)

= Prolita sexpunctella =

Species of moth

Prolita sexpunctella, the long-horned flat-back or groundling, is a moth of the family Gelechiidae. It is found in most of Europe and North America.

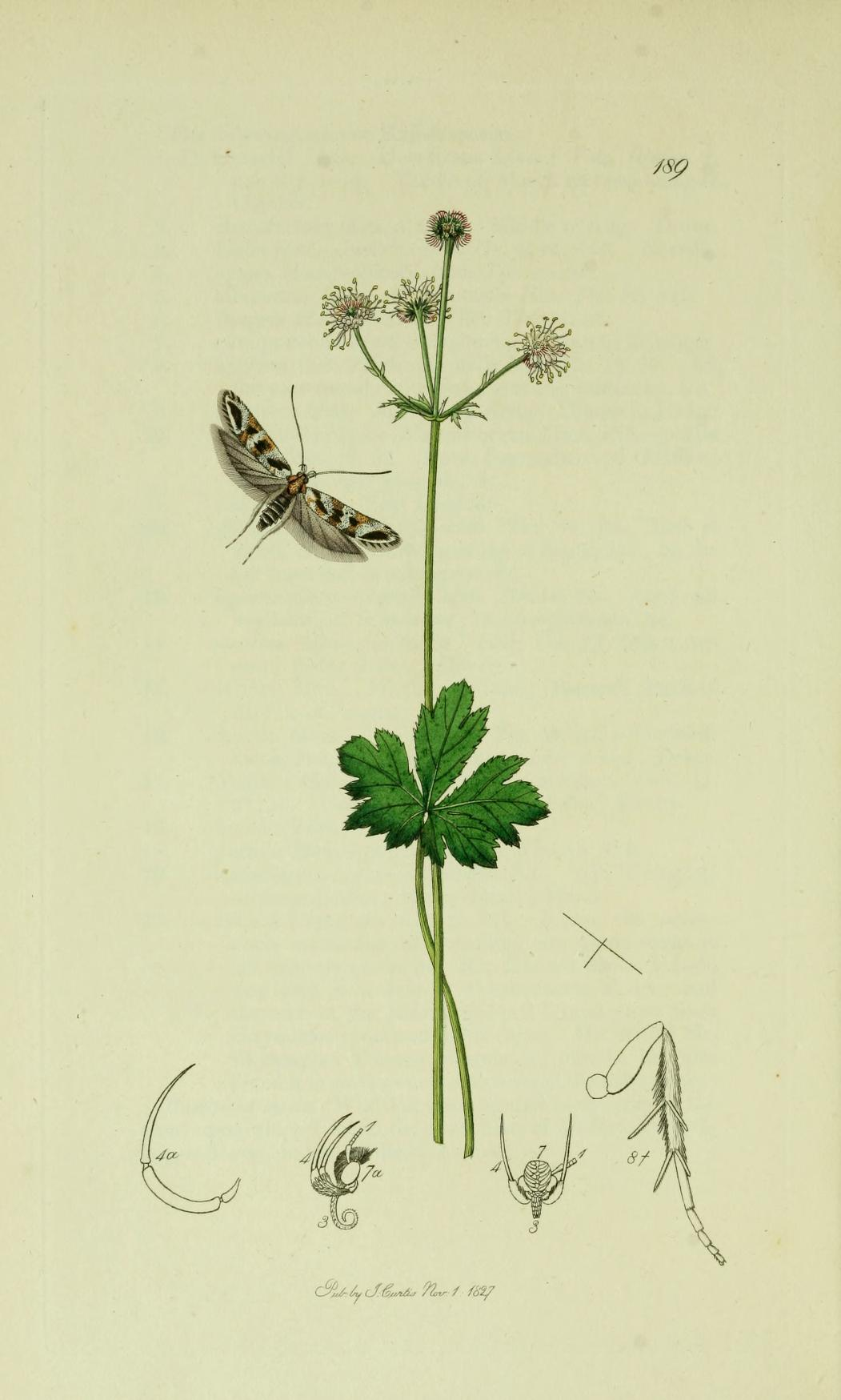
Illustration from John Curtis's British Entomology Volume 6

The wingspan is 13–17 mm. The terminal joint of palpi is as long as second. Forewings dark reddish-brown, suffused with dark fuscous towards base and termen in disc; five fasciae of white irroration, first basal, produced along dorsum, second at 1/4, curved, third central, fourth somewhat inwards.curved, fifth slender, terminal; stigmata dark fuscous, first discal above plical. Hindwings slightly over 1, fuscous.

Adults are on wing from May to June. They are day-flyers.

The larvae feed on the leaves of Calluna species (including Calluna vulgaris), Empetrum nigrum and Dryas octopetala. They spin the leaves together and overwintering within.
