= Prolita =

Scientific classification
- Domain: Eukaryota
- Kingdom: Animalia
- Phylum: Arthropoda
- Class: Insecta
- Order: Lepidoptera
- Family: Gelechiidae
- Subfamily: Gelechiinae
- Genus: Prolita; Leraut, 1993

Synonyms
- Lita Treitschke, 1833 (not Kollar, 1832)

Genus of moths

Prolita is a genus of moths belonging to the family Gelechiidae.

== Species ==
- Prolita barnesiella (Busck, 1903)
- Prolita deoia (Hodges, 1966)
- Prolita dialis (Hodges, 1966)
- Prolita geniata (Hodges, 1966)
- Prolita incicur (Hodges, 1966)
- Prolita invariabilis (Kearfott, 1908)
- Prolita jubata (Hodges, 1966)
- Prolita maenadis (Hodges, 1966)
- Prolita nefrens (Hodges, 1966)
- Prolita obnubila (Hodges, 1966)
- Prolita pagella (Hodges, 1966)
- Prolita princeps (Busck, 1910)
- Prolita puertella (Busck, 1916)
- Prolita recens (Hodges, 1966)
- Prolita rectistrigella (Barnes & Busck, 1920)
- Prolita sexpunctella (Fabricius, 1794)
- Prolita sironae (Hodges, 1966)
- Prolita solutella (Zeller, 1839)
- Prolita texanella (Chambers, 1880)
- Prolita thaliae (Hodges, 1966)
- Prolita variabilis (Busck, 1903)
- Prolita veledae (Hodges, 1966)
