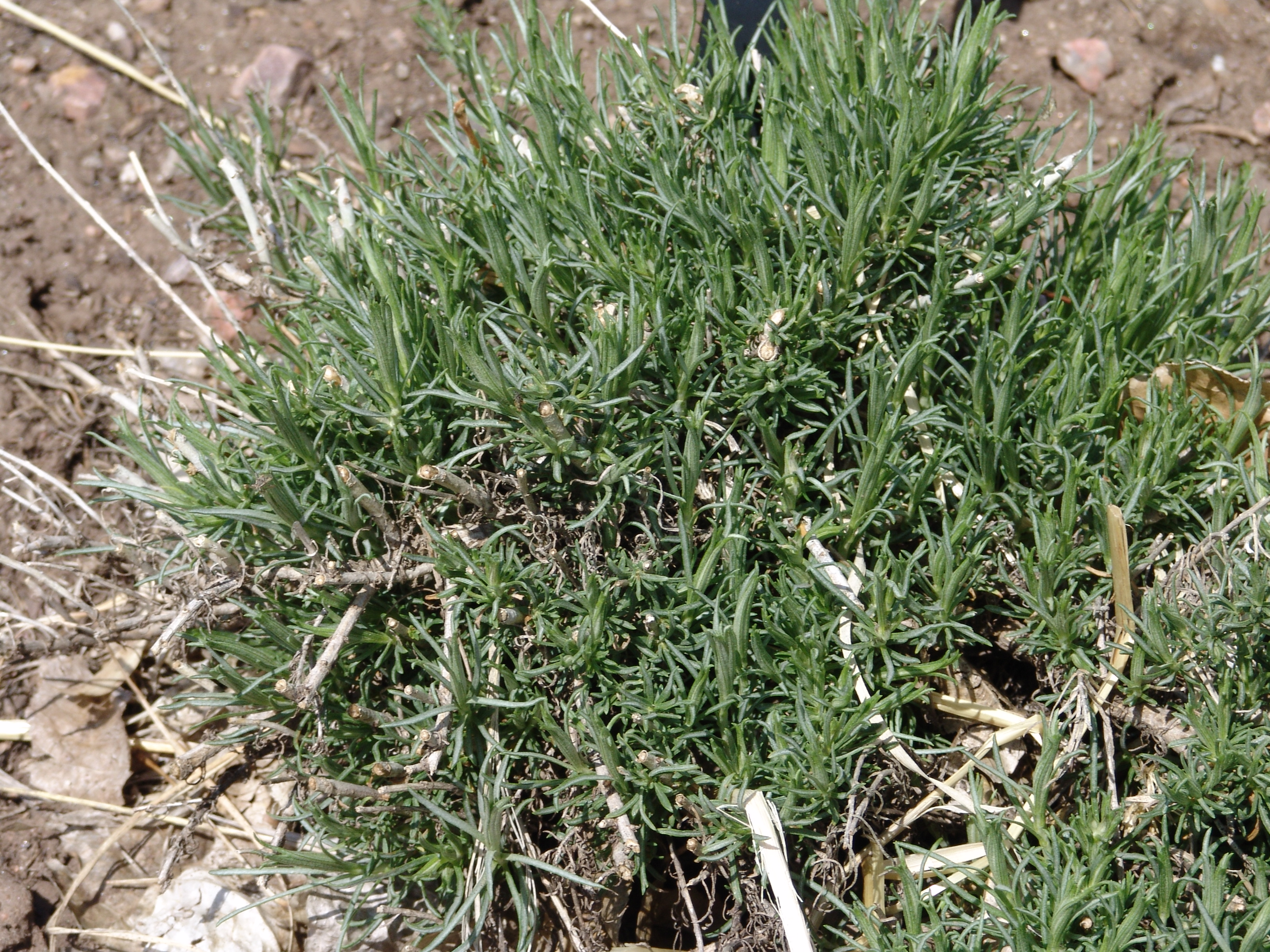

Conservation status
- Secure (NatureServe)

Scientific classification
- Kingdom: Plantae
- Clade: Tracheophytes
- Clade: Angiosperms
- Clade: Eudicots
- Clade: Asterids
- Order: Asterales
- Family: Asteraceae
- Genus: Chrysothamnus
- Species: C. greenei

Binomial name
- Chrysothamnus greenei (A.Gray) Greene

Synonyms
- Bigelowia greenei A.Gray; Chrysothamnus filifolius Rydb.; Chrysothamnus laricinus Greene; Chrysothamnus scoparius Rydb.; Ericameria filifolia (Rydb.) L.C.Anderson

= Chrysothamnus greenei =

Species of flowering plant

Chrysothamnus greenei, called Greene's rabbitbrush , is a North American species of flowering plants in the tribe Astereae within the family Asteraceae. It has been found in eastern California (Mono + Inyo Counties), Nevada, Arizona, New Mexico, Utah, Colorado, and southern Wyoming (Sweetwater County).

Chrysothamnus greenei is a branching shrub up to 50 cm (20 inches) tall with gray bark. It has many small, yellow flower heads clumped into dense arrays. The species grows in sandy locations in desert regions.
