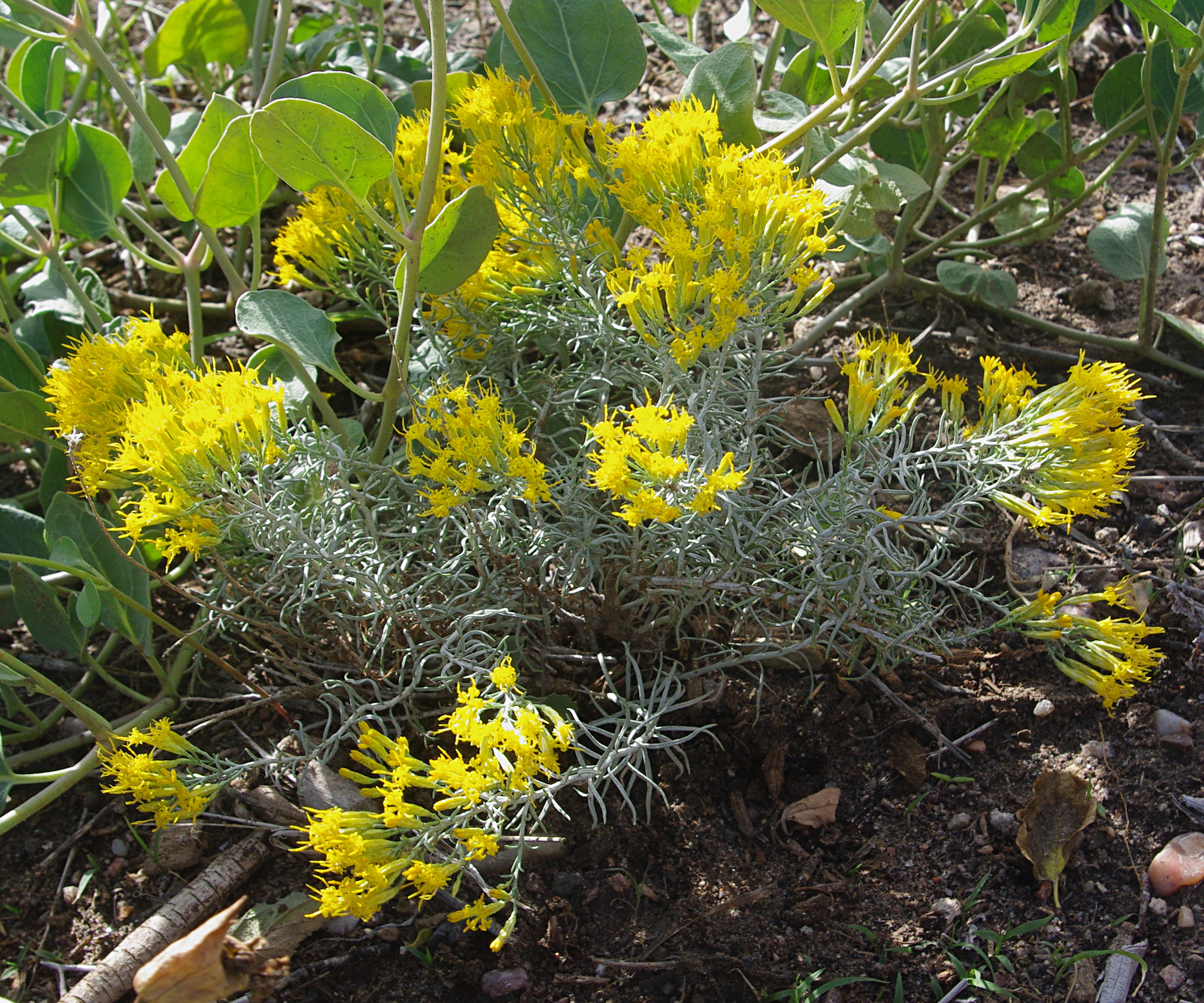

Conservation status
- Secure (NatureServe)

Scientific classification
- Kingdom: Plantae
- Clade: Tracheophytes
- Clade: Angiosperms
- Clade: Eudicots
- Clade: Asterids
- Order: Asterales
- Family: Asteraceae
- Genus: Chrysothamnus
- Species: C. depressus

Binomial name
- Chrysothamnus depressus Nutt.

Synonyms
- Aster depressus (A.Gray) Kuntze 1891 not Kit. 1864; Bigelowia depressa (Nutt.) A.Gray; Ericameria depressa (Nutt.) L.C.Anderson; Linosyris depressa (Nutt.) Torr.

= Chrysothamnus depressus =

Species of flowering plant

Chrysothamnus depressus called long-flowered rabbitbrush, is a North American species of flowering plants in the tribe Astereae within the family Asteraceae. It is native to the southwestern United States, the States of California, Arizona, New Mexico, Nevada, Utah, and Colorado. It grows in dry canyons, rocky crevices and similar habitats in the Mohave Desert, the Colorado Plateau, etc.

Chrysothamnus depressus is a branching shrub up to 50 cm (20 inches) tall. It produces large, dense arrays of small yellow flower heads, each with disc florets but no ray florets.
