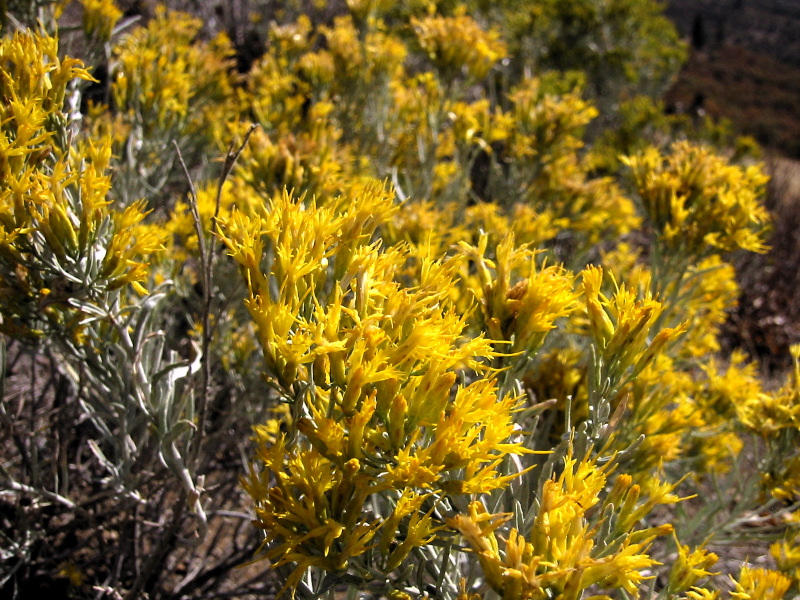
- Ericameria nauseosa in Oregon

Conservation status
- Secure (NatureServe)

Scientific classification
- Kingdom: Plantae
- Clade: Tracheophytes
- Clade: Angiosperms
- Clade: Eudicots
- Clade: Asterids
- Order: Asterales
- Family: Asteraceae
- Genus: Ericameria
- Species: E. nauseosa

Binomial name
- Ericameria nauseosa (Pall. ex Pursh) G.L.Nesom & G.I.Baird

Synonyms
- Synonymy: Chondrophora nauseosa (Pall. ex Pursh) Britton; Chrysothamnus nauseosus (Pall. ex Pursh) Britton; Chrysocoma nauseosa Pall.; Chrysothamnus frigidus Greene; Bigelowia nauseosa M.E.Jones; Chrysothamnus collinus Greene; Chrysothamnus concolor (A.Nelson) Rydb.; Chrysothamnus pallidus A.Nelson; Aster edwardii Kuntze; Bigelowia juncea Greene; Chrysothamnus junceus (Greene) Greene; Chrysothamnus plattensis (Greene) Greene; Machaeranthera scabrella (Greene) Shinners, syn of var. ammophila; Aster binominatus Kuntze, syn of var. bigelovii; Bigelowia bigelovii (A.Gray) A.Gray, syn of var. bigelovii; Chrysothamnus bigelovii (A.Gray) Greene, syn of var. bigelovii; Chrysothamnus glareosus (M.E.Jones) Rydb., syn of var. bigelovii; Chrysothamnus moquianus Greene, syn of var. bigelovii; Linosyris bigelovii A.Gray, syn of var. bigelovii; Bigelowia ceruminosa (Durand & Hilg.) A.Gray, syn of var. ceruminosa; Chrysothamnus ceruminosus (Durand & Hilg.) Greene, syn of var. ceruminosa; Linosyris ceruminosus Durand & Hilg., syn of var. ceruminosa; Chrysothamnus angustus Greene, syn of var. consimilis; Chrysothamnus confinis Greene, syn of var. consimilis; Chrysothamnus consimilis Greene, syn of var. consimilis; Chrysothamnus falcatus Greene, syn of var. consimilis; Chrysothamnus patens Rydb. syn of var. consimilis; Chrysothamnus pinifolius Greene, syn of var. consimilis; Chrysothamnus tortuosus Greene, syn of var. consimilis; Bigelowia graveolens (Nutt.) A.Gray, syn of var. graveolens; Chrysocoma graveolens Nutt., syn of var. graveolens; Chrysothamnus dracunculoides (DC.) Nutt., syn of var. graveolens; Chrysothamnus graveolens (Nutt.) Greene, syn of var. graveolens; Chrysothamnus laetevirens Greene, syn of var. graveolens; Chrysothamnus virens Greene, syn of var. graveolens; Linosyris graveolens (Nutt.) Torr. & A.Gray, syn of var. graveolens; Chrysothamnus gnaphalodes (Greene) Greene, syn of var. hololeuca; Chrysothamnus appendiculatus (Eastw.) A.Heller, syn of var. latisquamea; Chrysothamnus arizonicus (Greene) Greene, syn of var. latisquamea; Chrysothamnus latisquameus (A.Gray) Greene, syn of var. leiosperma; Aster leiospermus (A.Gray) Kuntze, syn of var. leiosperma; Bigelowia leiosperma A.Gray, syn of var. leiosperma; Chrysothamnus leiospermus (A.Gray) Greene, syn of var. leiosperma; Aster mohavensis (Greene) Kuntze, syn of var. mohavensis; Bigelowia mohavensis Greene, syn of var. mohavensis; Bigelowia mohavensis Greene ex A.Gray, syn of var. mohavensis; Chrysothamnus mohavensis (Greene) Greene, syn of var. mohavensis; Bigelowia glareosa M.E.Jones, syn of var. psilocarpa; Chrysothamnus salicifolius Rydb., syn of var. salicifolia; Chrysothamnus californicus Greene, syn of var. speciosa; Chrysothamnus formosus Greene, syn of var. speciosa; Chrysothamnus macounii Greene, syn of var. speciosa; Chrysothamnus occidentalis (Greene) Greene, syn of var. speciosa; Chrysothamnus orthophyllus Greene, syn of var. speciosa; Chrysothamnus pulcherrimus A.Nelson, syn of var. speciosa; Chrysothamnus speciosus Nutt., syn of var. speciosa; Bigelowia turbinata M.E.Jones, syn of var. turbinata; Chrysothamnus turbinatus (M.E.Jones) Rydb., syn of var. turbinata

= Ericameria nauseosa =

Species of flowering plant

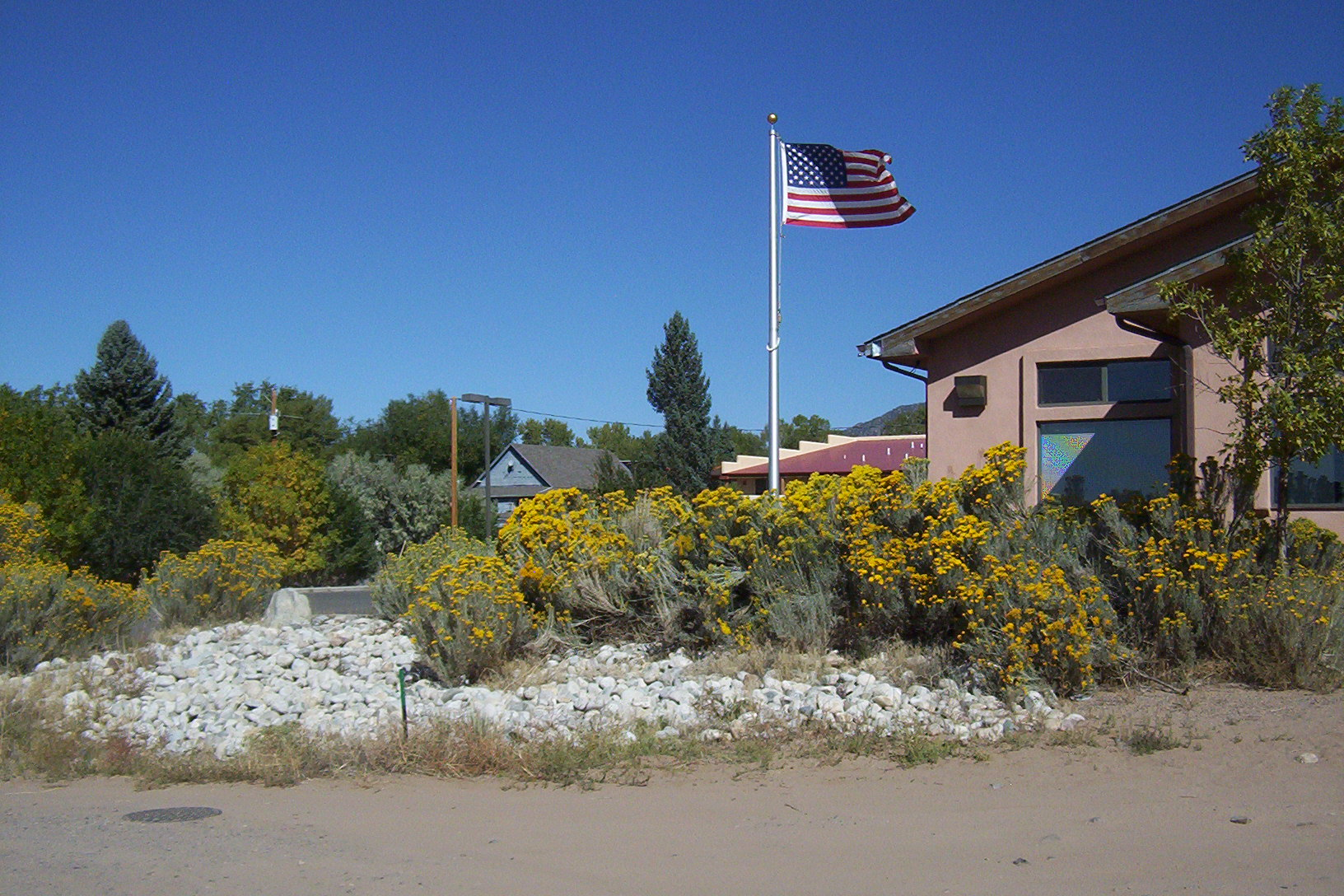
Volunteer chamisa in the landscaping of the post office in Crestone, Colorado

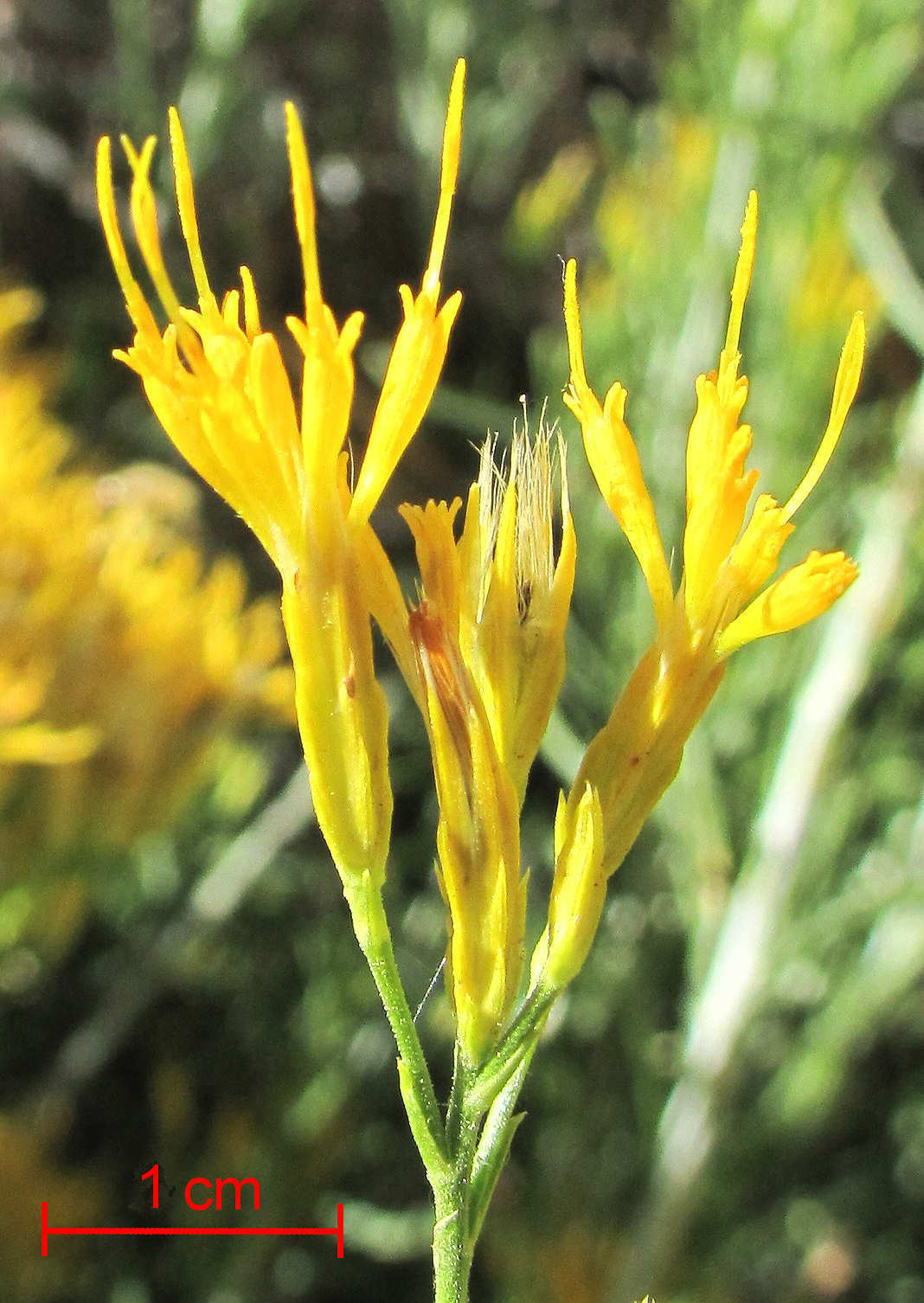
Flower heads, each with five individual flowers. Most of the flower heads in the cluster of heads were removed for this image.

Ericameria nauseosa (formerly Chrysothamnus nauseosus), commonly known as chamisa, rubber rabbitbrush, and gray rabbitbrush, is a shrub in the sunflower family (Aster) found in the arid regions of western North America.

Two subspecies have been described, consimilis (the green form with 8 varieties) and nauseosa (the gray form with 14 varieties).

== Description ==
Ericameria nauseosa is a perennial shrub that can be as short at 10 centimeters (4 in) or as tall as 2.5 meters (8 ft 2 in), however it is generally 0.6 to 1.5 m (2 to 5 ft). The leaves, depending on the subspecies, are 2–7.5 centimetres (3/4–3 inches) long and narrow to spatula-shaped. Both the flexible (rubbery) stems and the leaves are greenish-gray with a soft felt-like covering.

It blooms from August to October and produces pungent-smelling, golden-yellow flowers. The flower heads are 6–13 millimetres (1/4–1/2 in) long and made up of 5 small, yellow, tubular disk flowers, and occur in umbrella-shaped terminal clusters. The shrub reproduces from seeds and root sprouts.

== Taxonomy ==
Rubber rabbitbrush was moved from the genus Chrysothamnus to the genus Ericameria in a 1993 paper. The findings of a 2003 phylogenetic investigation of Ericameria were consistent with the move of the species to Ericameria. The second edition of the Jepson plant manual and the United States Department of Agriculture's Germplasm Resources Information Network have adopted the name Ericameria nauseosa.

The specific epithet means 'heavy scented'.

=== Subspecies and varieties ===
Recognized infraspecific taxa from The Plant List with distribution information from Flora of North America and Tropicos:

- Ericameria nauseosa subsp. consimilis (Greene) G.L.Nesom & G.I.Baird (green form)
  - Ericameria nauseosa var. arenaria (L.C.Anderson) G.L.Nesom & G.I.Baird – sandstone in Arizona, New Mexico, Utah
  - Ericameria nauseosa var. arta (A.Nelson) G.L.Nesom & G.I.Baird – Idaho, Oregon
  - Ericameria nauseosa var. ceruminosa (Durand & Hilg.) G.L.Nesom & G.I.Baird – gravelly arroyos in Mohave Desert of California
  - Ericameria nauseosa var. juncea (Greene) G.L.Nesom & G.I.Baird – Utah
  - Ericameria nauseosa var. leiosperma (A.Gray) G.L.Nesom & G.I.Baird – sandy + rocky sites in Arizona, California, Colorado, Nevada, Utah
  - Ericameria nauseosa var. mohavensis (Greene) G.L.Nesom & G.I.Baird – scrublands in California, Nevada
  - Ericameria nauseosa var. nitida (L.C.Anderson) G.L.Nesom & G.I.Baird – dry streambeds in Arizona, New Mexico, Utah
  - Ericameria nauseosa var. turbinata (M.E.Jones) G.L.Nesom & G.I.Baird – sand dunes in Arizona, Nevada, Utah
- Ericameria nauseosa subsp. nauseosa (gray form)
  - Ericameria nauseosa var. ammophila L.C.Anderson – Colorado
  - Ericameria nauseosa var. bernardina (H.M.Hall) G.L.Nesom & G.I.Baird – open pine forests in California; Baja California
  - Ericameria nauseosa var. bigelovii (A.Gray) G.L.Nesom & G.I.Baird – dry slopes in Arizona, Colorado, New Mexico, Utah
  - Ericameria nauseosa var. graveolens (Nutt.) Reveal & Schuyler – plains in Sask.; Arizona, Colorado, Idaho, Kansas, Montana, Nebraska, Nevada, New Mexico, Dakotas, Oklahoma, Texas, Utah, Wyoming
  - Ericameria nauseosa var. hololeuca (A.Gray) G.L.Nesom & G.I.Baird – slopes in Arizona, California, Idaho, Nevada, New Mexico, Oregon, Utah
  - Ericameria nauseosa var. iridis (L.C.Anderson) G.L.Nesom & G.I.Baird – steep, barren slopes in Sevier County in Utah
  - Ericameria nauseosa var. latisquamea (A.Gray) G.L.Nesom & G.I.Baird - dry streambeds in Arizona, New Mexico; Baja California, Sonora
  - Ericameria nauseosa var. nana (Cronquist) G.L.Nesom & G.I.Baird – ridges and cliffs in Idaho, Oregon, Washington
  - Ericameria nauseosa var. nauseosa – plains + hills in Alberta, Saskatchewan; Colorado, Idaho, Montana, Nebraska, Dakotas., Wyoming
  - Ericameria nauseosa var. oreophila (A.Nelson) G.L.Nesom & G.I.Baird – Arizona, California, Colorado, Idaho, Montana, Nevada, New Mexico, Oregon, Utah, Wyoming, Baja California
  - Ericameria nauseosa var. psilocarpa (S.F.Blake) G.L.Nesom & G.I.Baird – sagebrush scrub in eastern Utah
  - Ericameria nauseosa var. salicifolia (Rydb.) G.L.Nesom & G.I.Baird – brushlands in Utah
  - Ericameria nauseosa var. speciosa (Nutt.) G.L.Nesom & G.I.Baird – brush + open woodlands in Alberta, British Columbia, California, Colorado, Idaho, Montana, Nevada, Oregon, Utah, Washington, Wyoming
  - Ericameria nauseosa var. texensis (L.C.Anderson) G.L.Nesom & G.I.Baird – Guadalupe Mountains in Texas + New Mexico
  - Ericameria nauseosa var. washoensis (L.C.Anderson) G.L.Nesom & G.I.Baird – open rocky sites in grasslands of northeastern California and northwestern Nevada

== Distribution and habitat ==
It grows in the arid regions of western Canada, western United States (from the western Great Plains to the Pacific) and northern Mexico.

== Ecology ==
Along with associated species, like big sage and western wheat grass, rubber rabbitbrush is only lightly or occasionally used by herbivores during the summer. However, it can be heavily used during the winter when other food sources are scarce and on depleted rangelands. Some of the species that consume it include mule deer, elk, pronghorns, and black-tailed jackrabbits. It is considered poor forage for almost all domestic animals, though sheep are reported to consume significant amounts of it in Utah. It is also frequently used as shelter by jackrabbits. Dense stands of this species often grow on poorly managed rangelands, in disturbed areas along roadways and on abandoned agricultural property.

The species often occurs with Chrysothamnus viscidiflorus.

== Cultivation ==
Rabbitbrush, Ericameria nauseosa, has gained popularity as an ornamental xeriscaping shrub in areas where water conservation is important. It thrives in a wide range of coarse, alkaline soils that are common to desert environments. Pruning the shrub back to several inches in early spring, before new growth begins, may help improve the shrub's ornamental value. The varieties Ericameria nauseosa var. nauseosa and Ericameria nauseosa var. speciosa are especially valued as they rarely exceed 24 inches and will often only reach a foot in height. Gardeners appreciate the enthusiastic late season blooms as well as the foliage.

== Radioactivity ==
Specimens growing in Bayo Canyon, near Los Alamos, New Mexico, exhibit a concentration of radioactive strontium-90 300,000 times higher than a normal plant. Their roots reach into a closed nuclear waste treatment area, absorbing strontium in place of calcium due to their similar chemical properties. According to Joseph Masco, the radioactive shrubs are "indistinguishable from other shrubs without a Geiger counter."

== Uses ==
The Zuni people use the blossoms bigelovii variety of the nauseosa subspecies to make a yellow dye. They use the stems to make baskets. The Navajo also made a yellow dye from some of the flower heads. Native Americans of the southwest would also cook the leaves of the plant with cornmeal to raise the bread.

=== Possible commercial uses ===
Rubber rabbitbrush was considered as a source of rubber as early as 1904. Several studies have been conducted on the possible use of rubber rabbitbrush as a source of rubber including ones during World Wars I and II, and in 1987. Between 2005 and 2008, the University of Nevada researched possible material applications of rubber rabbitbrush. One possible commercial use of the species would be as a source for hypoallergenic rubber for use in products designed for people with latex allergies.

== Gallery ==
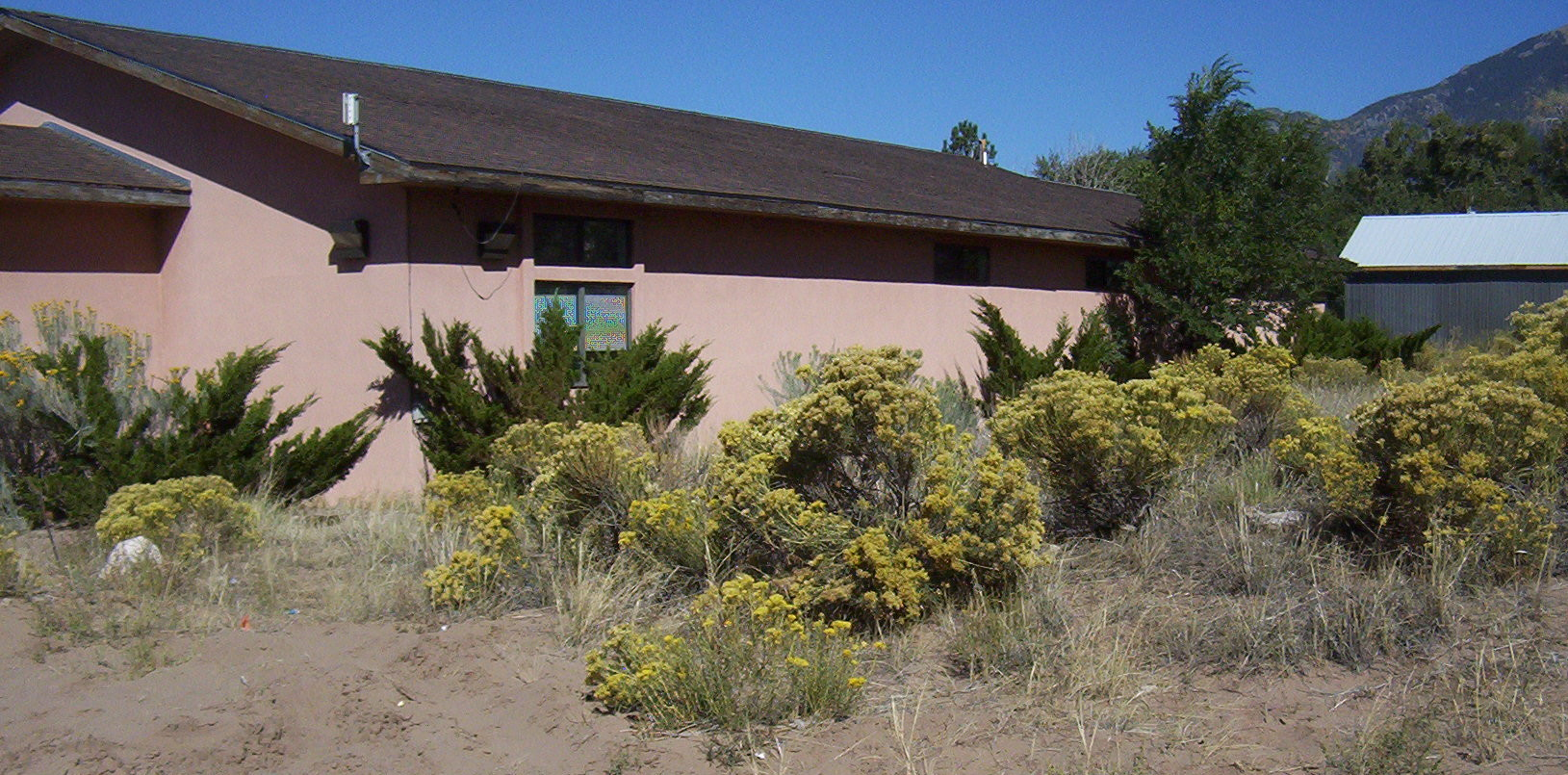
Rabbitbrush native to the area near the post office in Crestone, Colorado

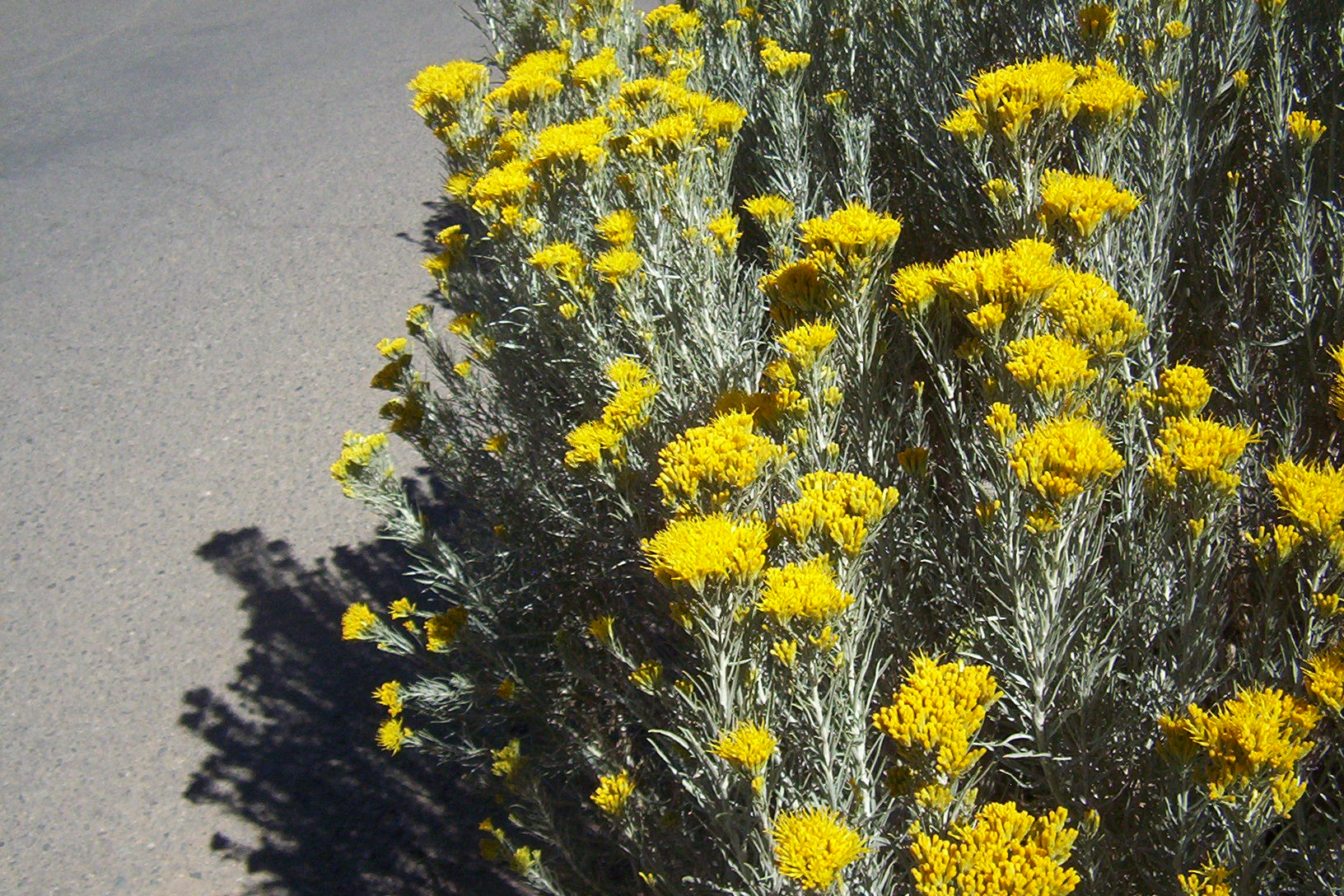
Blooms of the decorative rabbitbrush used at the Crestone post office.

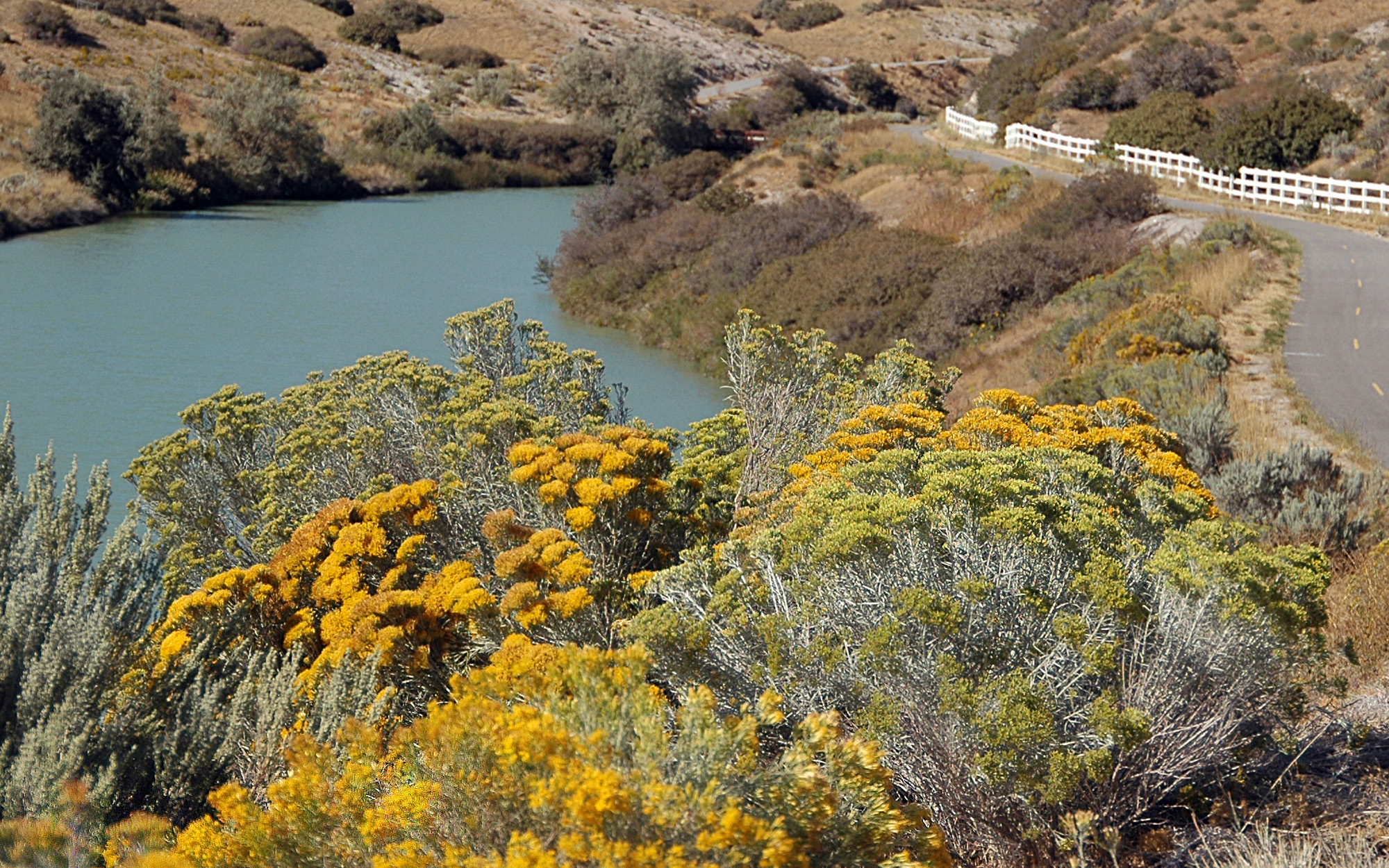
Rubber rabbitbrush in Utah

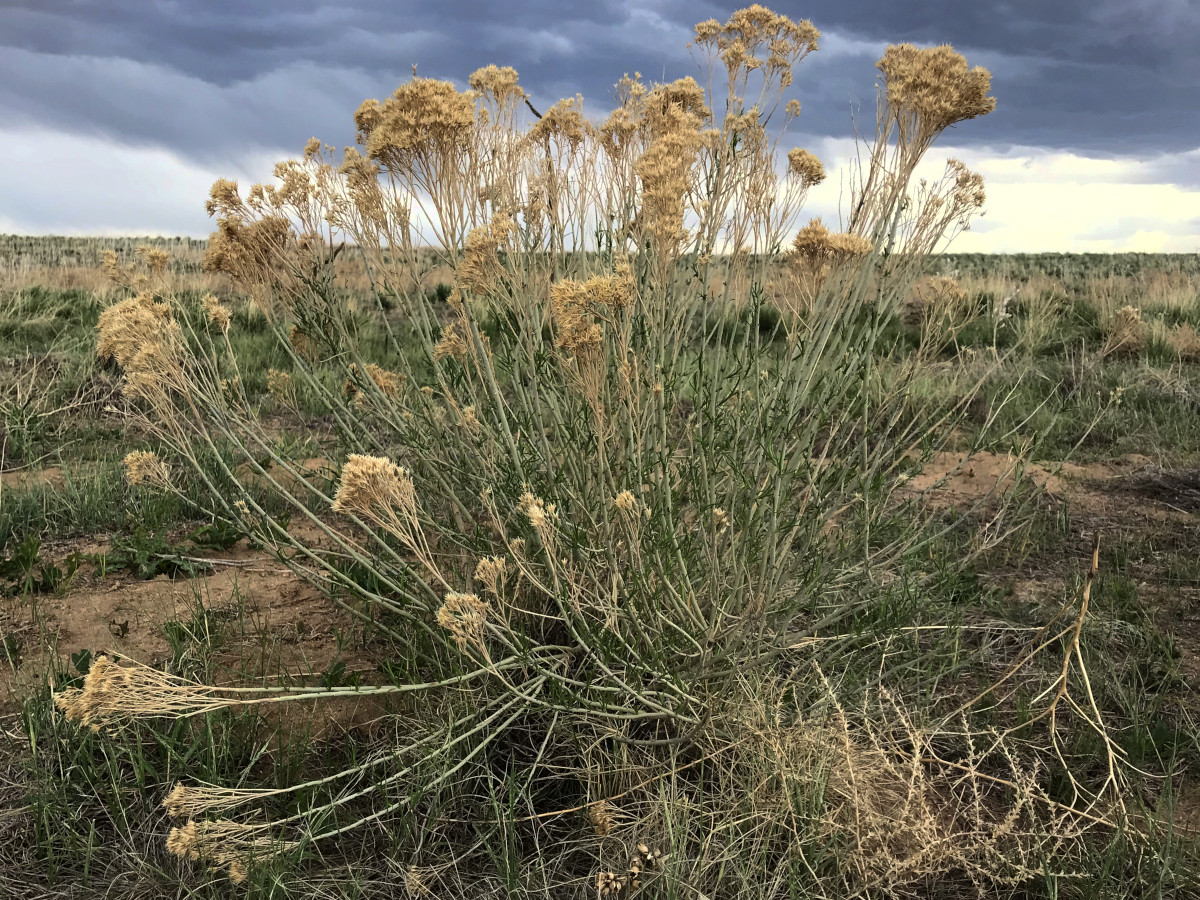
At Rocky Mountain Arsenal National Wildlife Refuge, Colorado
