= 3-Hydroxyacetophenone =

Names
- Preferred IUPAC name 1-(3-Hydroxyphenyl)ethan-1-one
- Other names 1-(3-Hydroxyphenyl)ethanone; 3-Acetylphenol m-Hydroxyacetophenone; 3'-Hydroxyacetophenone

Identifiers
CAS Number	121-71-1
3D model (JSmol)	Interactive image
ChemSpider	8174
ECHA InfoCard	100.004.086
PubChem CID	8487
UNII	UV3GO1D90J
CompTox Dashboard (EPA)	DTXSID5059533
- InChI: InChI=1S/C8H8O2/c1-6(9)7-3-2-4-8(10)5-7/h2-5,10H,1H3 Key: LUJMEECXHPYQOF-UHFFFAOYSA-N
- SMILES: CC(=O)C1=CC(=CC=C1)O

Properties
Chemical formula	C_{8}H_{8}O_{2}
Molar mass	136.150 g·mol^{−1}
Density	1.099 g/cm^{3}
Melting point	96 °C (205 °F; 369 K)
Boiling point	296 °C (565 °F; 569 K)
- Except where otherwise noted, data are given for materials in their standard state (at 25 °C [77 °F], 100 kPa). Infobox references

3-Hydroxyacetophenone is a chemical compound. It is a component of castoreum, the exudate from the castor sacs of the mature beaver.

== Related compounds ==
Humans excrete small amounts of conjugated 2-amino-3-hydroxyacetophenone, a product of tryptophan metabolism, in the urine.

The plant Chrysothamnus viscidiflorus (Asteraceae) contains an m-hydroxyacetophenone named viscidone.

== See also ==
- 4-Hydroxyacetophenone
