= Pungenin =

- Chemical structure of pungenin

Names
- IUPAC name 1-[3-(β-D-Glucopyranosyloxy)-4-hydroxyphenyl]ethan-1-one
- Systematic IUPAC name 1-(4-Hydroxy-3-{[(2S,3R,4S,5S,6R)-3,4,5-trihydroxy-6-(hydroxymethyl)oxan-2-yl]oxy}phenyl)ethan-1-one
- Other names Pungenin

Identifiers
CAS Number	55483-00-6
3D model (JSmol)	Interactive image
ChemSpider	24669457
PubChem CID	12314759
UNII	SC67H2S7NM
CompTox Dashboard (EPA)	DTXSID801216422
- InChI: InChI=1S/C14H18O8/c1-6(16)7-2-3-8(17)9(4-7)21-14-13(20)12(19)11(18)10(5-15)22-14/h2-4,10-15,17-20H,5H2,1H3/t10-,11-,12+,13-,14-/m1/s1 Key: AOXMCWFZPZRDPE-RKQHYHRCSA-N; InChI=1/C14H18O8/c1-6(16)7-2-3-8(17)9(4-7)21-14-13(20)12(19)11(18)10(5-15)22-14/h2-4,10-15,17-20H,5H2,1H3/t10-,11-,12+,13-,14-/m1/s1 Key: AOXMCWFZPZRDPE-RKQHYHRCBY
- SMILES: CC(=O)c1ccc(c(c1)O[C@H]2[C@@H]([C@H]([C@@H]([C@H](O2)CO)O)O)O)O

Properties
Chemical formula	C_{14}H_{18}O_{8}
Molar mass	314.290 g·mol^{−1}
- Except where otherwise noted, data are given for materials in their standard state (at 25 °C [77 °F], 100 kPa). Infobox references

Pungenin is a phenolic compound found in the needles of blue spruce (Picea pungens). It is the glucoside of 3,4-dihydroxyacetophenone.

== Chemical ecology ==
The compound serves a feeding deterrent against spruce budworm larvae.

== See also ==
- Picein
