= P-Toluic acid =

p-Toluic acid

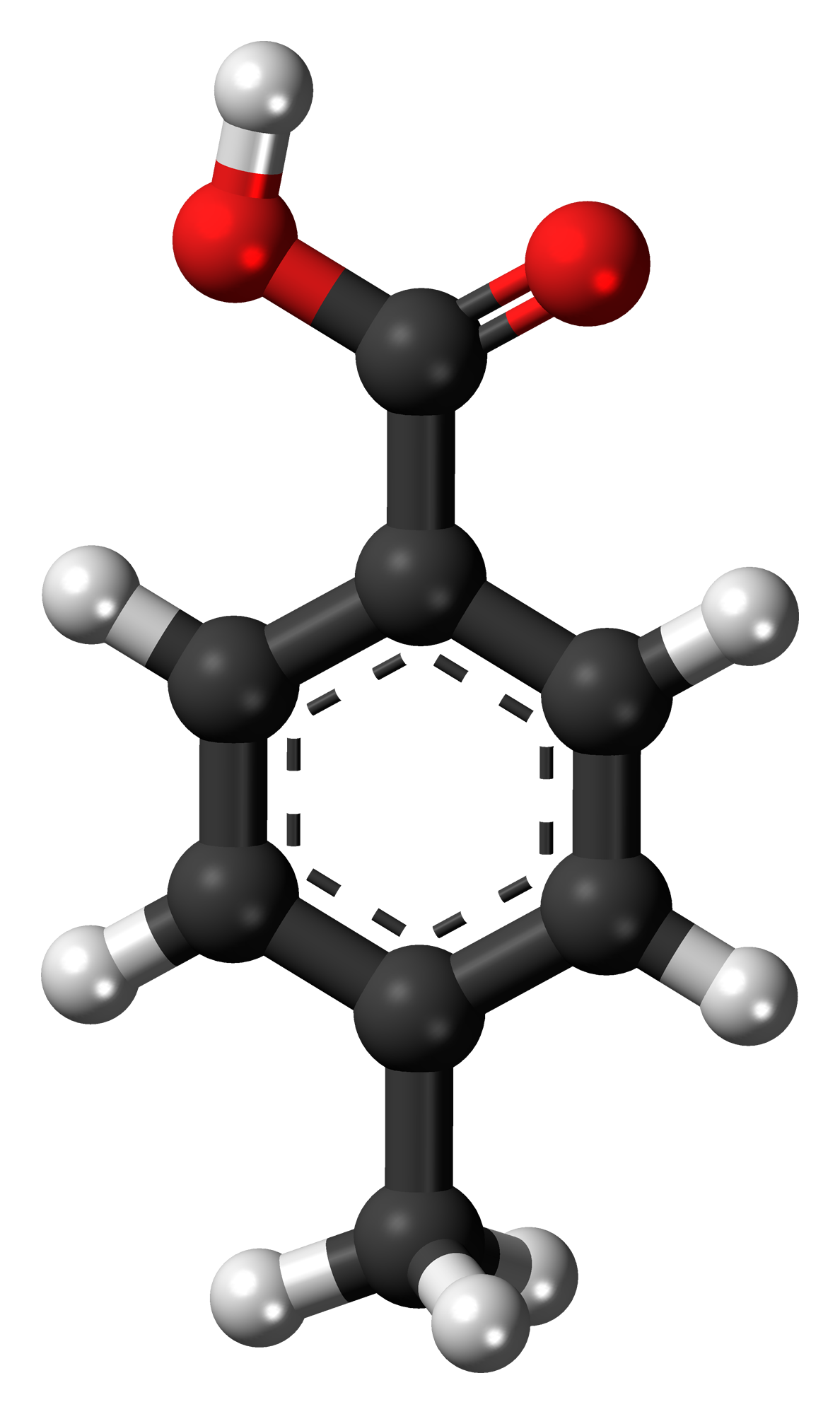

Names
- Preferred IUPAC name 4-Methylbenzoic acid
- Other names para-toluic acid p-toluic acid para-methylbenzoic acid p-methylbenzoic acid toluene-4-carboxylic acid crithminic acid

Identifiers
CAS Number	99-94-5
3D model (JSmol)	Interactive image
Beilstein Reference	3904552
ChEBI	CHEBI:36635
ChEMBL	ChEMBL21708
ChemSpider	7190
ECHA InfoCard	100.002.549
EC Number	202-803-3
KEGG	C01454
PubChem CID	7470
RTECS number	XU1575000
UNII	A26GBX5SSV
CompTox Dashboard (EPA)	DTXSID6021618
- InChI: InChI=1S/C8H8O2/c1-6-2-4-7(5-3-6)8(9)10/h2-5H,1H3,(H,9,10) Key: LPNBBFKOUUSUDB-UHFFFAOYSA-N; InChI=1/C8H8O2/c1-6-2-4-7(5-3-6)8(9)10/h2-5H,1H3,(H,9,10) Key: LPNBBFKOUUSUDB-UHFFFAOYAB
- SMILES: O=C(O)c1ccc(cc1)C

Properties
Chemical formula	C_{8}H_{8}O_{2}
Molar mass	136.150 g·mol^{−1}
Appearance	Crystalline solid
Density	1.06g/mL
Melting point	180 to 181 °C (356 to 358 °F; 453 to 454 K)
Boiling point	274 to 275 °C (525 to 527 °F; 547 to 548 K)
Solubility in water	Sparingly soluble in hot water

Thermochemistry
Std enthalpy of formation (Δ_{f}H^{⦵}_{298})	−429 kJ/mol
Std enthalpy of combustion (Δ_{c}H^{⦵}_{298})	3862 kJ/mol

Hazards
- GHS labelling
Pictograms	(GHS07: Exclamation mark)
Signal word	Warning
Hazard statements	H302, H315, H317, H319, H335
Precautionary statements	P261, P264, P270, P271, P272, P280, P301+P312, P302+P352, P304+P340, P305+P351+P338, P312, P321, P330, P332+P313, P333+P313, P337+P313, P362, P363, P403+P233, P405, P501
- Except where otherwise noted, data are given for materials in their standard state (at 25 °C [77 °F], 100 kPa). verify (what is ?) Infobox references

p-Toluic acid (4-methylbenzoic acid) is a substituted benzoic acid with the formula CH_{3}C_{6}H_{4}CO_{2}H. It is a white solid that is poorly soluble in water but soluble in acetone. A laboratory route to p-toluic acid involves oxidation of p-cymene with nitric acid.

== Role in production of terephthalic acid ==
p-Toluic acid is an intermediate in the conversion of p-xylene to terephthalic acid, a commodity chemical used in the manufacture of polyethylene terephthalate. It is generated both by the oxidation of p-xylene as well as the hydrogenolysis of 4-carboxybenzaldehyde. In related processes it is converted to methyl p-toluate, which is oxidized to monomethyl terephthalate.

p-Toluic acid is an intermediate in the production of terephthalic acid.

== See also ==
- o-Toluic acid
- m-Toluic acid
