= M-Toluic acid =

m-Toluic acid

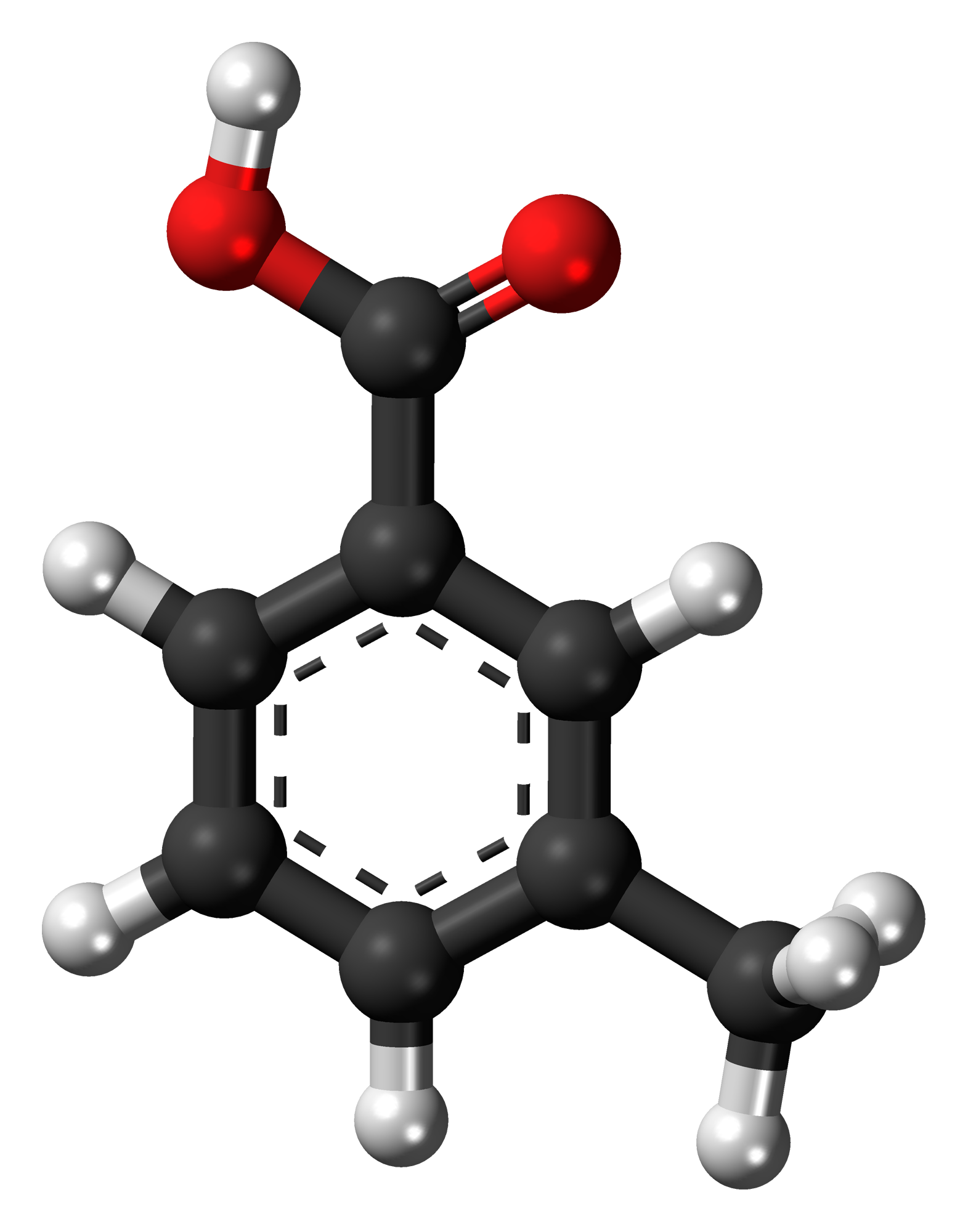

Names
- Preferred IUPAC name 3-Methylbenzoic acid
- Other names meta-Toluic acid m-Methylbenzoic acid meta-Methylbenzoic acid

Identifiers
CAS Number	99-04-7
3D model (JSmol)	Interactive image
ChEBI	CHEBI:10589
ChemSpider	7140
ECHA InfoCard	100.002.476
EC Number	247-107-0
KEGG	C07211
PubChem CID	7418
UNII	1UA7K8EEXT
CompTox Dashboard (EPA)	DTXSID1021617
- InChI: InChI=1S/C8H8O2/c1-6-3-2-4-7(5-6)8(9)10/h2-5H,1H3,(H,9,10) Key: GPSDUZXPYCFOSQ-UHFFFAOYSA-N
- SMILES: CC1=CC=CC(=C1)C(=O)O

Properties
Chemical formula	C_{8}H_{8}O_{2}
Molar mass	136.15 g/mol
Density	1.05 g/cm^{3}, solid
Melting point	111 to 113 °C (232 to 235 °F; 384 to 386 K)
Boiling point	263 °C (505 °F; 536 K)
Acidity (pK_{a})	4.27 (in water)

Hazards
Safety data sheet (SDS)	External MSDS

Related compounds
- Except where otherwise noted, data are given for materials in their standard state (at 25 °C [77 °F], 100 kPa). verify (what is ?) Infobox references

m-Toluic acid, (IUPAC: 3-methylbenzoic acid), is an aromatic carboxylic acid, with formula (CH_{3})C_{6}H_{4}(COOH). It is an isomer of p-toluic acid and o-toluic acid.

== Preparation ==
m-Toluic acid is often prepared in the laboratory by refluxing m-xylene with either nitric acid or potassium permanganate, oxidizing one of the methyl groups to COOH.

== Uses ==
It serves, among other purposes, as a precursor to DEET (N,N-diethyl-m-toluamide), the well-known insect repellent.
