= O-Toluic acid =

o-Toluic acid

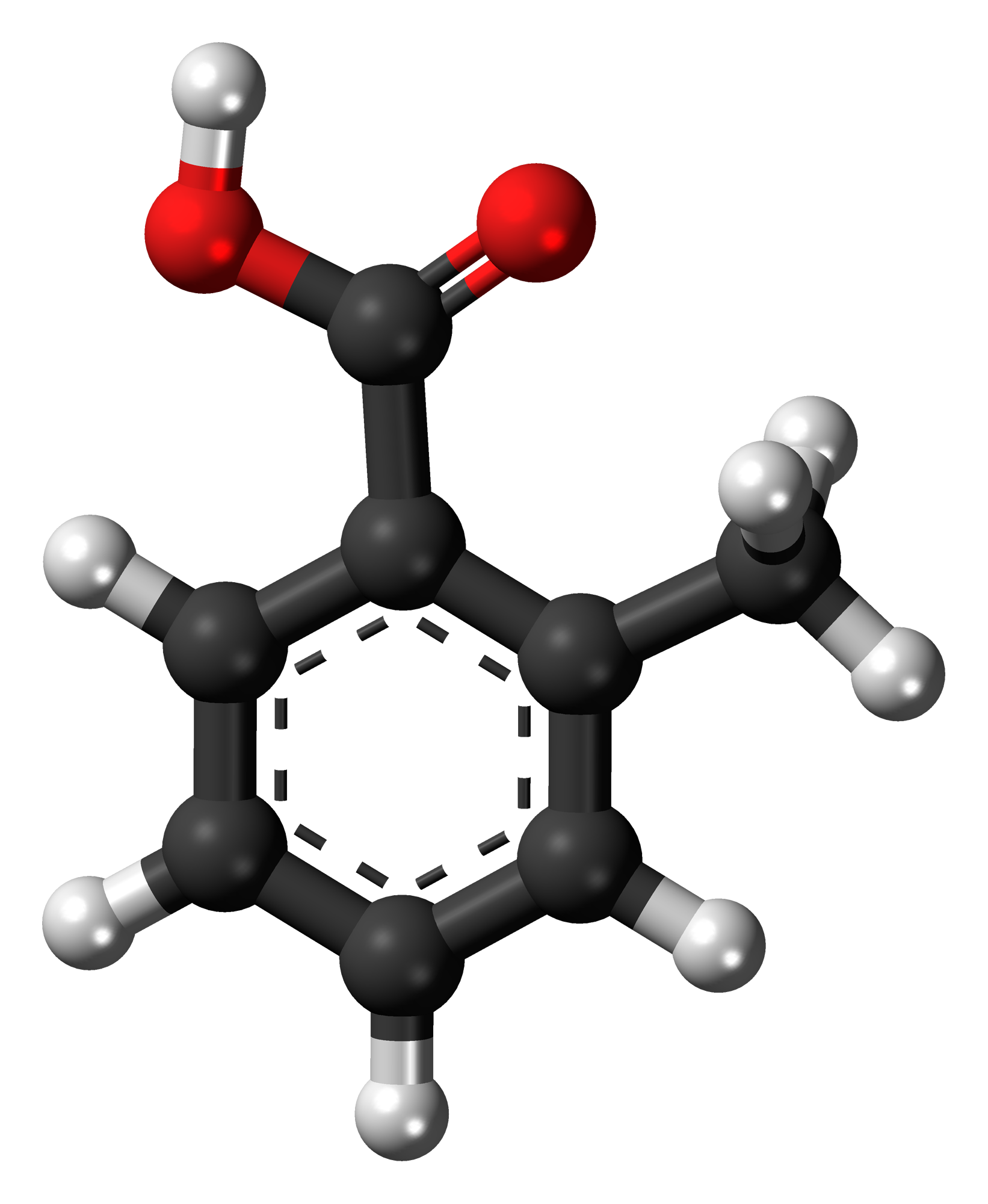

Names
- Preferred IUPAC name 2-Methylbenzoic acid
- Other names ortho-toluic acid

Identifiers
CAS Number	118-90-1
3D model (JSmol)	Interactive image
ChEBI	CHEBI:36632
ChEMBL	ChEMBL114957
ChemSpider	8070
ECHA InfoCard	100.003.896
KEGG	C07215
PubChem CID	8373
UNII	9NR3033Y0U
CompTox Dashboard (EPA)	DTXSID6026161
- InChI: InChI=1S/C8H8O2/c1-6-4-2-3-5-7(6)8(9)10/h2-5H,1H3,(H,9,10) Key: ZWLPBLYKEWSWPD-UHFFFAOYSA-N; InChI=1/C8H8O2/c1-6-4-2-3-5-7(6)8(9)10/h2-5H,1H3,(H,9,10) Key: ZWLPBLYKEWSWPD-UHFFFAOYAI
- SMILES: O=C(O)c1ccccc1C

Properties
Chemical formula	C_{8}H_{8}O_{2}
Molar mass	136.2 g/mol
Density	1.06 g/cm^{3}
Melting point	104 to 105 °C (219 to 221 °F; 377 to 378 K)
Boiling point	259 °C (498 °F; 532 K)
Magnetic susceptibility (χ)	−80.83·10^{−6} cm^{3}/mol
- Except where otherwise noted, data are given for materials in their standard state (at 25 °C [77 °F], 100 kPa). verify (what is ?) Infobox references

o-Toluic acid, also 2-methylbenzoic acid, is an aromatic carboxylic acid, with formula (CH_{3})C_{6}H_{4}(COOH). It is an isomer of p-toluic acid and m-toluic acid. When purified and recrystallized, o-toluic acid forms needle-shaped crystals. o-Toluic acid was first noticed by Sir William Ramsay, credited discoverer of the noble gases and winner of the 1904 Nobel Prize in Chemistry.

o-Toluic acid is prepared by oxidation of o-xylene with nitric acid.
