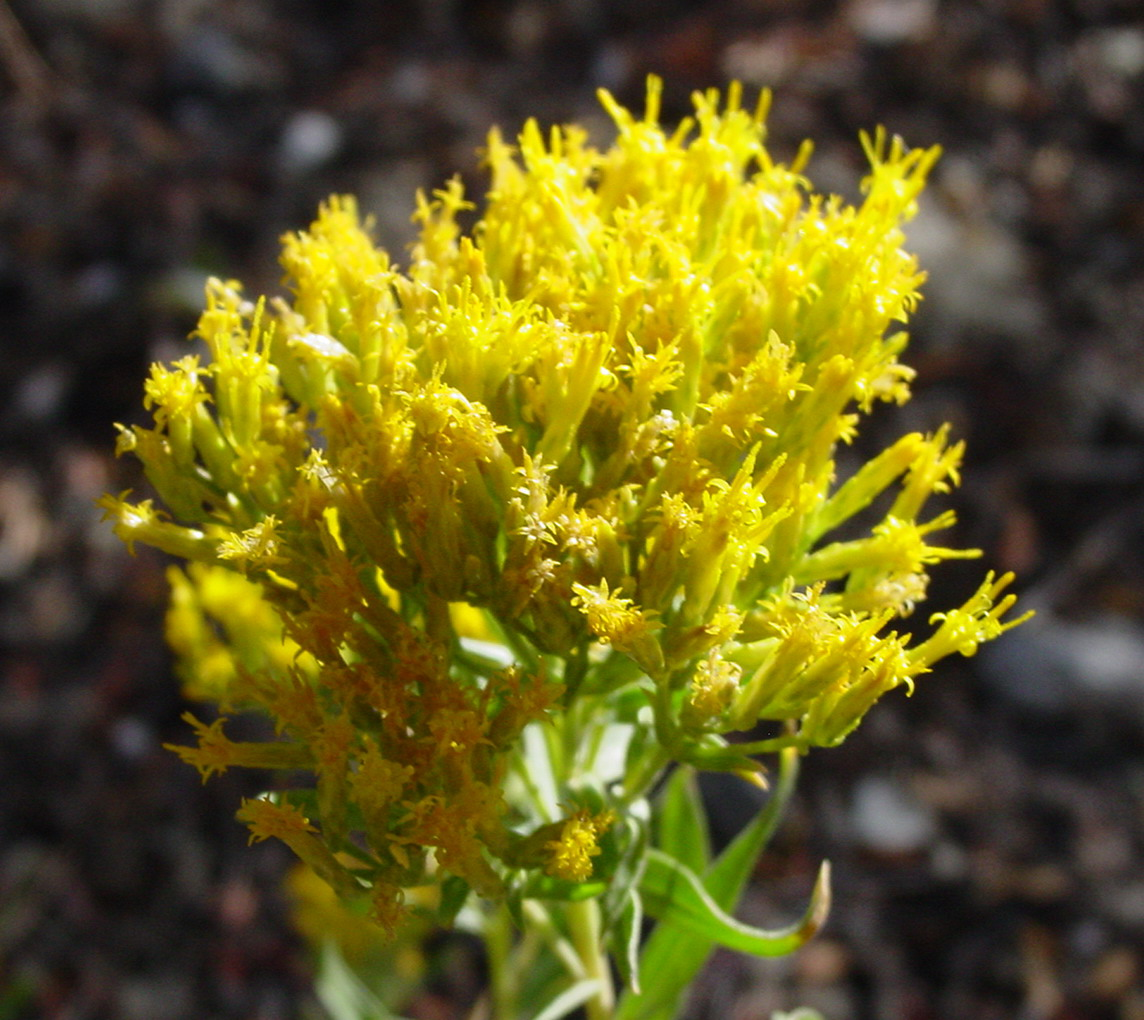

Conservation status
- Secure (NatureServe)

Scientific classification
- Kingdom: Plantae
- Clade: Tracheophytes
- Clade: Angiosperms
- Clade: Eudicots
- Clade: Asterids
- Order: Asterales
- Family: Asteraceae
- Genus: Chrysothamnus
- Species: C. viscidiflorus

Binomial name
- Chrysothamnus viscidiflorus (Hook.) Nutt.

Synonyms
- Synonymy: Aster viscidiflorus Kuntze; Bigelovia douglasii A.Gray; Bigelovia glauca (A.Nelson) K.Schum.; Bigelowia douglasii A.Gray; Bigelowia glauca (A.Nelson) K.Schum.; Chrysothamnus douglasii (A.Gray) Clem. & E.G.Clem.; Chrysothamnus glaucus A.Nelson; Chrysothamnus latifolius (D.C.Eaton) Rydb.; Chrysothamnus leucocladus Greene; Chrysothamnus pumilus Nutt.; Chrysothamnus serrulatus (Torr.) Rydb.; Chrysothamnus stenolepis Rydb.; Chrysothamnus tortifolius (A.Gray) Greene; Crinitaria viscidiflora Hook.; Ericameria viscidiflora (Hook.) L.C.Anderson; Linosyris viscidiflora (Hook.) Torr. & A.Gray; Chrysothamnus axillaris D.D.Keck, syn of subsp. axillaris; Chrysothamnus elegans Greene, syn of subsp. lanceolatus; Chrysothamnus lanceolatus Nutt., syn of subsp. lanceolatus; Chrysothamnus marianus Rydb., syn of subsp. puberulus; Chrysothamnus puberulus (D.C.Eaton) Greene, syn of subsp. puberulus

= Chrysothamnus viscidiflorus =

Species of flowering plant

Chrysothamnus viscidiflorus is an American species of shrub in the family Asteraceae known by the common names yellow rabbitbrush and green rabbitbrush.

== Description ==
Chrysothamnus viscidiflorus grows up to about 150 centimeters (5 feet) in height, with spreading, brittle, pale stem branches. The leaves are up to a few centimeters long and may be thin and thread-like or up to 1 cm wide and oblong. They are glandular, resinous, and sticky.

The inflorescence is a bushy cluster of flower heads, each head 0.5–1 cm long. The flower head is lined with sticky yellow-green phyllaries and contains several yellowish protruding flowers.

The fruit is a hairy achene a few millimeters long with a wispy pappus at the tip.

=== Subspecies and varieties ===
Subspecies and varieties include:

- Chrysothamnus viscidiflorus subsp. axillaris (D.D.Keck) L.C.Anderson — desert slopes in Arizona, California, Colorado, Nevada, Utah
- Chrysothamnus viscidiflorus subsp. lanceolatus (Nutt.) H.M.Hall & Clem. — Pennington County in South Dakota
- Chrysothamnus viscidiflorus subsp. planifolius L.C.Anderson — Arizona
- Chrysothamnus viscidiflorus subsp. puberulus (D.C.Eaton) H.M.Hall & Clem. — alpine zones in Arizona, California, Idaho, Nevada, Oregon, Utah
- Chrysothamnus viscidiflorus subsp. viscidiflorus — alpine talus in most of the species range
- Chrysothamnus viscidiflorus var. latifolius
- Chrysothamnus viscidiflorus var. serrulatus (Torr.) Greene — Utah, Nevada
- Chrysothamnus viscidiflorus var. stenophyllus
- Chrysothamnus viscidiflorus var. viscidiflorus

=== Chemistry ===
Chrysothamnus viscidiflorus contains an unusual m-hydroxyacetophenone derivative, named viscidone, and chromanone derivatives.

== Distribution and habitat ==
The plant is widespread in North America across much of the western United States and western Canada, from British Columbia and Montana south to California and New Mexico, with a few populations in the Black Hills of South Dakota and in western Nebraska, as well as in South America in the Andean valleys of Chile and Argentina.

The species grows in sagebrush and woodland habitat. It grows easily in alkaline and saline soils, and thrives on soils that are rich in calcium. It rapidly establishes in disturbed habitat, including burns, flooded washes, and rockslides, so it is a valuable shrub for revegetating damaged land such as overgrazed rangeland and abandoned mining areas.

== Ecology ==
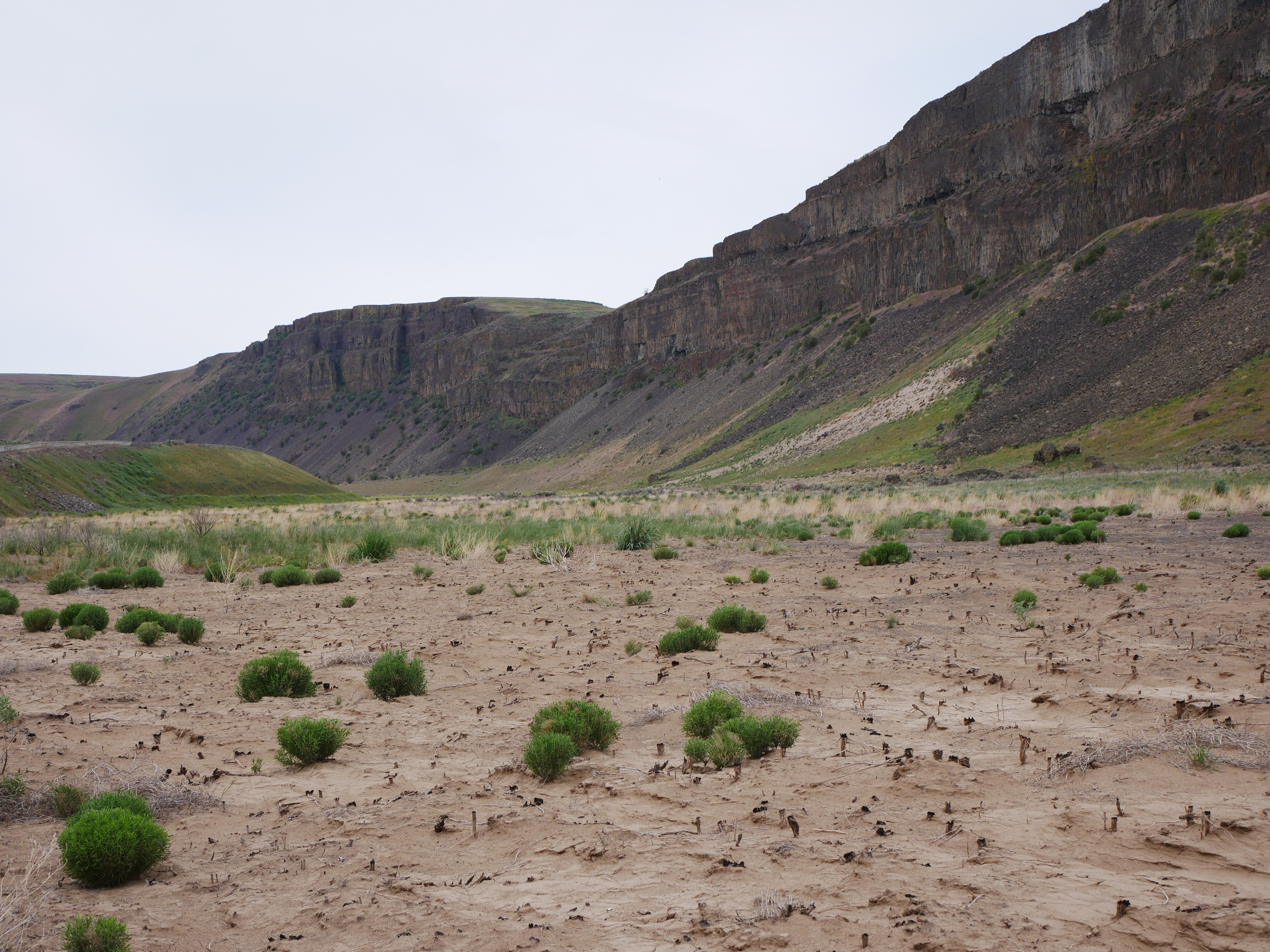
Chrysothamnus viscidiflorus ssp. lanceolatus resprouting from roots that survived a wildfire in eastern Washington

It is a larval host to the sagebrush checkerspot and it is an important nectar source in the fall. Range animals such as deer and antelope browse the foliage. It often occurs with Ericameria nauseosa.

Chrysothamnus viscidiflorus plants are typically killed by fire, but can resprout with sufficient energy reserves, and their windborne seeds can blow into a burned area and sprout vigorously. The numbers of plants often increase shortly after a fire and can dominate the landscape, but decreases as Artemisia tridentata (big sagebrush) recolonizes an area.
