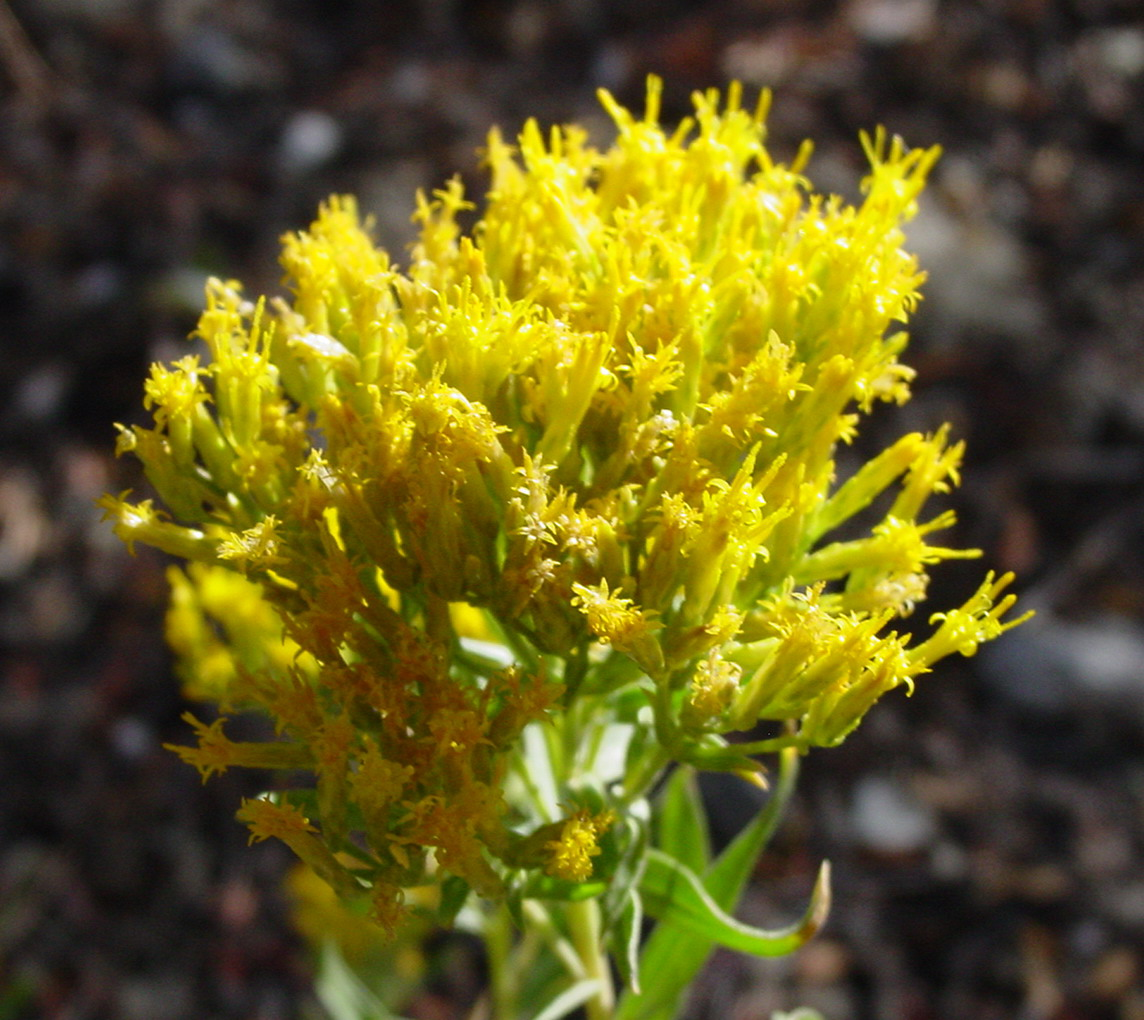
- Chrysothamnus viscidiflorus

Scientific classification
- Kingdom: Plantae
- Clade: Tracheophytes
- Clade: Angiosperms
- Clade: Eudicots
- Clade: Asterids
- Order: Asterales
- Family: Asteraceae
- Subfamily: Asteroideae
- Tribe: Astereae
- Subtribe: Solidagininae
- Genus: Chrysothamnus; Nutt.

Synonyms
- Vanclevea Greene

= Chrysothamnus =

Genus of flowering plants

Chrysothamnus, known as rabbitbrush, rabbitbush, and chamisa, are a genus of shrubs in the family Asteraceae. The native distribution is in the arid western United States, Canada, and northern Mexico. It is known for its bright white or yellow flowers in late summer.

Chrysothamnus may grow up to a 120 cm (47 in) tall shrub or subshrub, usually with woody stem bases. The leaves are alternate, sessile or with short petioles, with entire edges. The flowerheads are singular or in clusters. Each composite flower often has five to 6 (though sometimes upwards of 40) yellow disc florets and no ray florets.

Chrysothamnus species are used as food plants by the larvae of some Lepidoptera species including Coleophora linosyridella, Coleophora viscidiflorella (which have both been recorded on C. viscidiflorus) and Schinia walsinghami.

Species

- Chrysothamnus depressus – dwarf rabbitbrush, longflower rabbitbrush – California Nevada Arizona Utah Colorado New Mexico
- Chrysothamnus eremobius – pintwater rabbitbrush, remote rabbitbrush – Nevada
- Chrysothamnus greenei – Greene's rabbitbrush – California Nevada Arizona Utah Colorado New Mexico Wyoming
- Chrysothamnus humilis – Truckee rabbitbrush – California Nevada Oregon Washington Idaho
- Chrysothamnus molestus – Arizona rabbitbrush – Arizona
- Chrysothamnus scopulorum – Arizona Utah
- Chrysothamnus stylosus – Arizona Utah
- Chrysothamnus vaseyi – Vasey's rabbitbrush – Arizona Utah New Mexico Colorado Wyoming
- Chrysothamnus viscidiflorus – yellow rabbitbrush – British Columbia Washington Oregon California Arizona Nevada Idaho Montana Wyoming Utah Colorado New Mexico South Dakota Nebraska
