= Piceol =

Phenolic compound found in Norway spruces

- Chemical structure of piceol

Names
- Preferred IUPAC name 1-(4-Hydroxyphenyl)ethan-1-one
- Other names 1-(4-Hydroxyphenyl)ethanone; 4-Hydroxyacetophenone; 4'-Hydroxyacetophenone p-Hydroxyacetophenone

Identifiers
| CAS Number | 99-93-4 |
| 3D model (JSmol) | Interactive image |
| ChEBI | CHEBI:28032 |
| ChemSpider | 7189 |
| ECHA InfoCard | 100.002.548 |
| PubChem CID | 7469 |
| UNII | G1L3HT4CMH |
| CompTox Dashboard (EPA) | DTXSID0029133 |
- InChI: InChI=1S/C8H8O2/c1-6(9)7-2-4-8(10)5-3-7/h2-5,10H,1H3 Key: TXFPEBPIARQUIG-UHFFFAOYSA-N; InChI=1S/C8H8O2/c1-6(9)7-2-4-8(10)5-3-7/h2-5,10H,1H3 Key: TXFPEBPIARQUIG-UHFFFAOYSA-N
- SMILES: CC(=O)C1=CC=C(C=C1)O

Properties
| Chemical formula | C_{8}H_{8}O_{2} |
| Molar mass | 136.150 g·mol^{−1} |
- Except where otherwise noted, data are given for materials in their standard state (at 25 °C [77 °F], 100 kPa). Infobox references

Piceol is a phenolic compound found in the needles and in mycorrhizal roots of Norway spruces (Picea abies). Picein is the glucoside of piceol.

== Chemical production ==
In the industrial chemical synthesis of 4-hydroxyacetophenone, phenol reacts with acetic acid or preferably with acetic anhydride in the presence of anhydrous hydrogen fluoride (HF) or hydrofluoric acid as solvent and acylation catalyst—instead of aluminum chloride (AlCl_{3}), which must be used in stoichiometric amounts and generates problematic waste—to initially form acetic acid phenyl ester (I). This intermediate is converted to 4-hydroxyacetophenone (II) via a Fries rearrangement. As by-products (< 10 %), the isomer 2′-hydroxyacetophenone (III) and traces of 4-acetoxyacetophenone (4-acetylphenyl acetate) (IV) are also formed.

Synthesis of 4-hydroxyacetophenone (4-HAP)

Working with HF and hydrofluoric acid as solvents, as well as their recovery, requires complex processes and costly equipment made of special materials such as Hastelloy C-276 and surface coatings of fluoropolymers (e.g. Teflon), due to their high toxicity and corrosiveness.

Since the product 4-HAP strongly retains HF, it must be removed by distillation using, for example, n-hexane. Impurities are separated through multiple recrystallization steps from ethanol–water mixtures or similar solvents.

== Properties ==
Pure 4-hydroxyacetophenone is a white crystalline powder that dissolves readily in lower alcohols and diethyl ether. Its odour ranges from odourless to floral. The substance is readily biodegradable and approved for use in food under FEMA/GRAS #4330 (GRAS = generally recognized as safe).

== Applications ==
4-Hydroxyacetophenone exhibits antioxidant, fungicidal, and bacteriostatic properties and is therefore used to stabilize cosmetic formulations.

== Uses ==
Piceol is used in the synthesis of several pharmaceutical drugs including octopamine, sotalol, bamethan, and dyclonine.

Piceol can be used to make acetaminophen by condensation with hydroxylamine and subsequent Beckmann rearrangement in acid.

4-Vinylphenol (4-hydroxystyrene) can be synthesized through a multi-step reaction sequence from 4-hydroxyacetophenone (II). First, 4-HAP is acetylated with acetic anhydride to form 4-acetoxyacetophenone (IV). Catalytic hydrogenation of (IV) yields 4-acetoxyphenylmethylcarbinol (V), which is then dehydrated upon heating to produce 4-acetoxystyrene (4-vinylphenyl acetate) (VI). Finally, the acetyl group can be hydrolyzed under basic or acidic catalysis to yield the target compound 4-hydroxystyrene (VII).

Synthesis of 4-vinylphenol from 4-hydroxyacetophenone (4-HAP)

Chain polymerization of 4-vinylphenol produces poly(4-hydroxystyrene), which serves as a resin binder in photoresists. During the polymerization of 4-hydroxystyrene, chain termination reactions can occur through hydrogen abstraction from the phenolic hydroxyl group, resulting in lower molar masses and broader molar mass distributions. Therefore, the protected precursor 4-acetoxystyrene (VI) is often polymerized, after which the acetyl protecting group is removed via a polymer-analogous reaction.

A seven-step synthesis of the beta-2-sympathomimetic salbutamol (albuterol) also starts from 4-hydroxyacetophenone and yields the racemate.

The neurotransmitter Octopamine can be obtained by reacting 4-HAP with amyl nitrite or preferably tert-butyl nitrite in the presence of hydrogen chloride to form 4-hydroxyisonitrosoacetophenone, followed by catalytic hydrogenation. Under more intensive hydrogenation conditions, tyramine—the decarboxylation product of the amino acid tyrosine—is formed.

Synthesis of octopamine+tyramine from 4-hydroxyacetophenone (4-HAP)

A standard route to the peripheral vasodilator Bamethane also starts from 4-hydroxyacetophenone. In this process, the compound is first protected by a benzoyl group, brominated at the methyl group, reacted with n-butylamine to form a secondary amine, and finally hydrogenated over a palladium catalyst to yield the racemic end product.

Synthesis of bamethane from 4-hydroxyacetophenone (4-HAP)

The naturally occurring homologous series compound Synephrine (oxedrine) can be synthesized analogously from 4-HAP, but its use is now considered obsolete due to questionable efficacy and safety concerns.

Alkylation of 4-HAP, e.g. with 1-bromobutane, produces 4-butoxyacetophenone, from which the local anaesthetic dyclonine can be obtained.

The analgesic Paracetamol can also be produced industrially from 4-hydroxyacetophenone by reaction with bis(hydroxylammonium) sulfate (NH_{3}OH)_{2}SO_{4} to form the corresponding oxime, followed by a Beckmann rearrangement to yield 4-acetamidophenol (acetaminophen).

Synthesis of paracetamol from 4-hydroxyacetophenone (4-HAP)

However, this process proved economically uncompetitive due to high investment and environmental costs (e.g. disposal of sulfate generated from hydroxylammonium sulfate). A production plant commissioned in 1990 by Hoechst Celanese Corp. in Bishop, TX, with a capacity of 9,000 tons per year, was shut down in 2001.

Anticonvulsants are also possible by Mannich reaction:

== Metabolism ==
Diprenylated derivatives of piceol can be isolated from Ophryosporus macrodon.

4-Hydroxyacetophenone monooxygenase is an enzyme that transforms piceol into O-acetylhydroquinone. This enzyme is found in Pseudomonas fluorescens.

== See also ==
- Paroxypropione, where the acetyl group is replaced by a propionyl group.
- Apocynin
