= C8H3ClO3 =

The molecular formula C_{8}H_{3}ClO_{3} (molar mass: 182.56 g/mol, exact mass: 181.9771 u) may refer to:

- 3-Chlorophthalic anhydride
- 4-Chlorophthalic anhydride
