= Mono-BOC-cystamine =

Names
- Preferred IUPAC name tert-Butyl {2-[(2-aminoethyl)disulfanyl]ethyl}carbamate

Identifiers
CAS Number	485800-26-8
3D model (JSmol)	Interactive image
ChemSpider	11263014
PubChem CID	22245556
UNII	7LN7QV4A5Q
CompTox Dashboard (EPA)	DTXSID001030317
- InChI: InChI=1S/C9H20N2O2S2/c1-9(2,3)13-8(12)11-5-7-15-14-6-4-10/h4-7,10H2,1-3H3,(H,11,12) Key: XGHNLHVZHBSTHO-UHFFFAOYSA-N; InChI=1/C9H20N2O2S2/c1-9(2,3)13-8(12)11-5-7-15-14-6-4-10/h4-7,10H2,1-3H3,(H,11,12) Key: XGHNLHVZHBSTHO-UHFFFAOYAG
- SMILES: NCCSSCCNC(=O)OC(C)(C)C

Properties
Chemical formula	C_{9}H_{20}N_{2}O_{2}S_{2}
Molar mass	252.39 g·mol^{−1}
- Except where otherwise noted, data are given for materials in their standard state (at 25 °C [77 °F], 100 kPa). Infobox references

Mono-BOC-cystamine (mono BOC protected cystamine) is a tert-butyloxycarbonyl (BOC) derivative of cystamine used as crosslinker in biotechnology and molecular biology applications. This compound was originally reported by Hansen et al.

== Uses ==
The disulfide chain allows the mono-BOC-cystamine to be easily cleaved, allowing removal of the tagging residue when desired.

Mono-BOC-cystamine is used as a crosslinker for the synthesis of cleavable photo-cross-linking reagent.

Mono-BOC-cystamine is used as a crosslinker for the synthesis of a biodegradable cystamine spacer in PGA-cystamine-Gd-DO3A, which shows improved MRI contrast for breast carcinoma imaging in mice.

== Related compounds ==
- Biotin-Peg2-Amine
- Biotin-Peg2-Maleimide
- Biotin-Peg3-Amine
- Biotin-Peg4-NHS
