= Chlorophthalic anhydride =

Chlorophthalic anhydride may refer to:

- 3-Chlorophthalic anhydride
- 4-Chlorophthalic anhydride
