= C9H9NO4 =

The molecular formula C_{9}H_{9}NO_{4} (molar mass: 195.17 g/mol) may refer to:

- L-Dopaquinone, also known as o-dopaquinone
- Pencolide
- Salicyluric acid
- Benzadox
