= Eritadenine =

Names
- Preferred IUPAC name (2R,3R)-4-(6-Amino-9H-purin-9-yl)-2,3-dihydroxybutanoic acid
- Other names Lentysine; Lentinacin

Identifiers
CAS Number	23918-98-1
3D model (JSmol)	Interactive image
ChemSpider	140628
PubChem CID	159961
UNII	41T27K4B9F
CompTox Dashboard (EPA)	DTXSID00178632
- InChI: InChI=1S/C9H11N5O4/c10-7-5-8(12-2-11-7)14(3-13-5)1-4(15)6(16)9(17)18/h2-4,6,15-16H,1H2,(H,17,18)(H2,10,11,12)/t4-,6-/m1/s1 Key: LIEMBEWXEZJEEZ-INEUFUBQSA-N; InChI=1/C9H11N5O4/c10-7-5-8(12-2-11-7)14(3-13-5)1-4(15)6(16)9(17)18/h2-4,6,15-16H,1H2,(H,17,18)(H2,10,11,12)/t4-,6-/m1/s1 Key: LIEMBEWXEZJEEZ-INEUFUBQBZ
- SMILES: c1nc(c2c(n1)n(cn2)C[C@H]([C@H](C(=O)O)O)O)N

Properties
Chemical formula	C_{9}H_{11}N_{5}O_{4}
Molar mass	253.218 g·mol^{−1}
- Except where otherwise noted, data are given for materials in their standard state (at 25 °C [77 °F], 100 kPa). Infobox references

Eritadenine is a chemical compound found in shiitake mushrooms. Eritadenine is an inhibitor of S-adenosyl-L-homocysteine hydrolase (SAHH) and has hypocholesterolemic activity.

== Synthesis ==
The structure is a purine alkylated with an oxidized sugar fragment.

Eritadenine synthesis: Alternative synthesis:

Ring opening of the protected lactone (1), derived from erythrose with sodium phthalimide gives the acid 2; hydrazinolysis (cf Gabriel synthesis) then leads to the amino acid 3. Displacement of chlorine in pyrimidine 4 by the amine function on 3 serves to attach the future imidazole nitrogen and the sugar-derived sidechain (5). The nitro group is then reduced by catalytic hydrogenation, the resulting primary amine is the most basic and is selectively formylated with formic acid. These strongly acidic conditions serve to remove the acetonide protecting group as well (6). Treatment with NaOH then serves to close the imidazole ring, forming eritadenine (7)
