= Imide =

Class of chemical compounds

A general linear imide functional group

In organic chemistry, an imide is a functional group consisting of two acyl groups bound to nitrogen. The compounds are structurally related to acid anhydrides, although imides are more resistant to hydrolysis. In terms of commercial applications, imides are best known as components of high-strength polymers, called polyimides. Inorganic imides are also known as solid state or gaseous compounds, and the imido group (=NH) can also act as a ligand.

== Examples ==
The simplest example is diacetamide with the formula HN(COCH_{3})_{2}, formally the diacetylated derivative of ammonia.

Common imides are cyclic, formally derived from dicarboxylic acids and ammonia. The names of these cyclic imides reflect the parent acid; e.g. succinimide from succinic acid:

Cyclic imides
Common name	Systematic name	Structure	PubChem	Parent acid	Acid structure
Succinimide	Pyrrolidine-2,5-dione		11439	Succinic acid	
Maleimide	Pyrrole-2,5-dione		10935	Maleic acid	
Glutarimide	Piperidine-2,6-dione		70726	Glutaric acid	
Phthalimide	Isoindole-1,3-dione		6809	Phthalic acid	

Many imides are derived from primary amines as opposed to ammonia. These are indicated by N-substituent in the prefix. For example, N-ethylsuccinimide is derived from succinic acid and ethylamine.

== Physical properties ==
Being highly polar, imides exhibit good solubility in polar organic solvents. Unlike the structurally related acid anhydrides, they resist hydrolysis and some can even be recrystallized from boiling water.

The N–H center for imides derived from ammonia is acidic and can participate in hydrogen bonding. The N-H group is weakly acidic as indicated in the case of maleimide, with a pKa estimated at 10.

== Occurrence and applications ==
Many high strength or electrically conductive polymers contain imide subunits, i.e., the polyimides. One example is Kapton where the repeat unit consists of two imide groups derived from aromatic tetracarboxylic acids. Another example of polyimides is the polyglutarimide typically made from polymethylmethacrylate (PMMA) and ammonia or a primary amine by aminolysis and cyclization of the PMMA at high temperature and pressure, typically in an extruder. This technique is called reactive extrusion. A commercial polyglutarimide product based on the methylamine derivative of PMMA, called Kamax, was produced by the Rohm and Haas company. The toughness of these materials reflects the rigidity of the imide functional group.

Interest in the bioactivity of imide-containing compounds was sparked by the early discovery of the high bioactivity of the Cycloheximide as an inhibitor of protein biosynthesis in certain organisms. Thalidomide, famous for its adverse effects, is one result of this research. A number of fungicides and herbicides contain the imide functionality. Examples include Captan, which is considered carcinogenic under some conditions, and Procymidone.

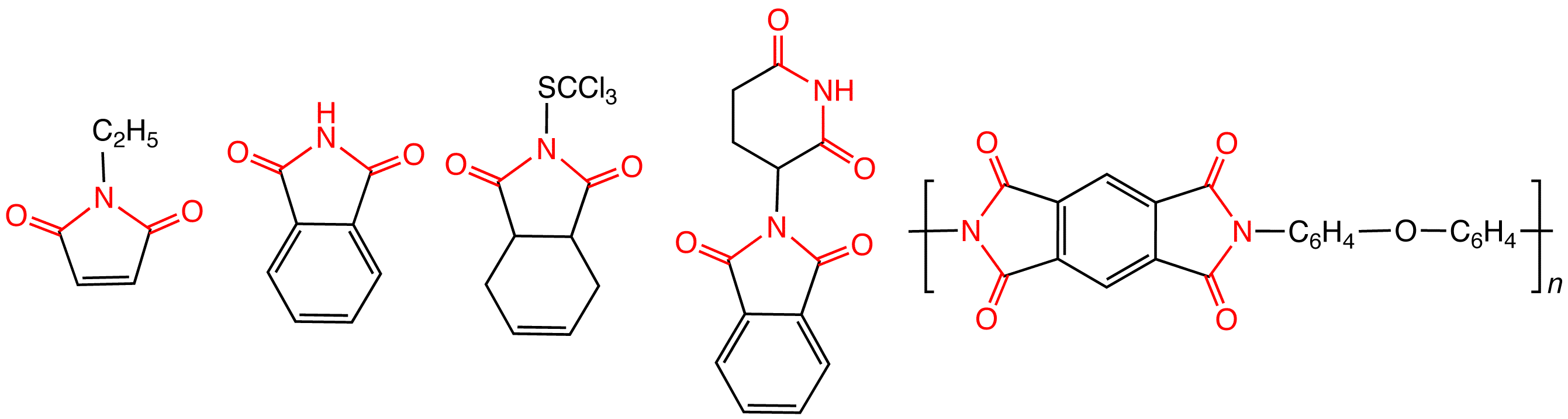
Illustrative imides, from left: N-ethylmaleimide, a biochemical reagent; phthalimide, an industrial chemical intermediate; Captan, a controversial pesticide; thalidomide, a drug that once caused many birth defects; a subunit of Kapton, a high strength polymer used to make space suits.

In the 21st century new interest arose in thalidomide's immunomodulatory effects, leading to the class of immunomodulators known as immunomodulatory imide drugs (IMiDs).

== Preparation ==
Most common imides are prepared by heating dicarboxylic acids or their anhydrides and ammonia or primary amines. The result is a condensation reaction:

(RCO)_{2}O + R′NH_{2} → (RCO)_{2}NR′ + H_{2}O

These reactions proceed via the intermediacy of amides. The intramolecular reaction of a carboxylic acid with an amide is far faster than the intermolecular reaction, which is rarely observed.

They may also be produced via the oxidation of amides, particularly when starting from lactams.

R(CO)NHCH_{2}R' + 2 [O] → R(CO)N(CO)R' + H_{2}O

Certain imides can also be prepared in the isoimide-to-imide Mumm rearrangement.

== Reactions ==
For imides derived from ammonia, the N–H center is weakly acidic. Thus, alkali metal salts of imides can be prepared by conventional bases such as potassium hydroxide. The conjugate base of phthalimide is potassium phthalimide. These anion can be alkylated to give N-alkylimides, which in turn can be degraded to release the primary amine. Strong nucleophiles, such as potassium hydroxide or hydrazine are used in the release step.

Treatment of imides with halogens and base gives the N-halo derivatives. Examples that are useful in organic synthesis are N-chlorosuccinimide and N-bromosuccinimide, which respectively serve as sources of "Cl^{+}" and "Br^{+}" in organic synthesis.

With base followed by acid, cyclic imides open to give amido-acids. Thus, maleamic acid (HO_{2}CCH=CHC(O)NH_{2}) is derived from maleimide, succinamic acid (HO_{2}CCH_{2}CH_{2}C(O)NH_{2}) from succinimide, phthalimidic acid HO_{2}CC_{6}H_{4}C(O)NH_{2} from phthalimide.

== Related compounds ==
Organic compounds called carbodiimides have the formula RN=C=NR. They are unrelated to imides.

Acylureas are imides, but where one acyl group is in fact a carbamoyl: R-C(=O)-NH-C(=O)NH_{2}.

=== Isoimides ===
Isoimides are isomeric with imides and have the formula RC(O)OC(NR′)R″. They are often intermediates that convert to the more symmetrical imides. Isoimides upon heating rearrange to imides:

RC(O)OC(NR′)R → [RC(O)]_{2}NR′

== See also ==
- Inorganic imide
