= Siegmund Gabriel =

German chemist (1851–1924)

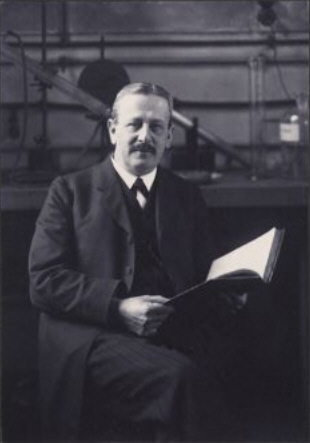
- Siegmund Gabriel
- Born: 7 November 1851; Berlin, Kingdom of Prussia
- Died: 22 March 1924 (aged 72); Berlin, Germany
- Education: University of Heidelberg
- Known for: Gabriel Synthesis
- Scientific career
- Workplaces: University of Berlin

Siegmund Gabriel (7 November 1851 – 22 March 1924) was a German chemist.

== Scientific career ==
Siegmund Gabriel began studying chemistry at the University of Berlin in 1871. He continued his studies at the University of Heidelberg in 1872 with Professor Robert Wilhelm Bunsen. In 1874, he received his doctorate and then returned to Berlin. He began teaching as an assistant, initially in the inorganic chemistry department, before becoming an associate professor in 1886. Gabriel later turned to organic chemistry in his own research.

One of Gabriel’s most significant contributions to organic chemistry was made in 1887, when he discovered the Gabriel Synthesis with his partner James Dornbush. The Gabriel Synthesis is a reaction which synthesizes pure primary amines, involving the reaction of potassium phthalimide with an alkyl halide, followed by hydrolysis. The Gabriel Synthesis was adapted by Gabriel in 1889 to a procedure for the preparation of amino acids.

In 1891 Gabriel synthesized pyrrolidine from l-amino-4-chlorobutane, and in 1892, using the same procedure, he prepared piperidine from 1-amino- 5-chloropentane. He was the first to prepare phthalazine in 1893 and, with his student James Colman, pyrimidine in 1899. In 1900, he devised a simpler method for obtaining pyrimidine using barbituric acid, and in 1903 he first prepared quinazoline. Gabriel also investigated oxazole, thiazole, and their derivatives.

Gabriel reported what became the Robinson–Gabriel Synthesis in 1910. In 1913, he was appointed full honorary professor at the University of Berlin, a position he retired from in 1921.

Gabriel was a member of the German Chemical Society and served on its board for many years.

== Personal life ==
Siegmund Gabriel was born on November 7, 1851, in Berlin, the youngest of factory owner Aron Gabriel and his wife Goldchen (Golde) née Pollnow's six children. His father owned a trimmings factory in Berlin.

On August 28, 1883, he married Anna née Fränkel, who was born on April 26, 1862, in Neustadt in Upper Silesia as the daughter of the entrepreneur Abraham Fränkel and his first wife Friederike née Caro. Siegmund and Anna Gabriel had two sons: Ernst, born in 1885, became a dermatologist and later earned his living as a chicken farmer after his emigration to Israel; Kurt, born in 1896, became a dentist and was able to continue to work in this profession after emigrating to New Zealand.

Siegmund Gabriel died in Berlin on March 22, 1924.

His widow Anna Gabriel was deported during the holocaust to Theresienstadt on October 30, 1942. She perished there on April 4, 1943.

Original documents from Siegmund Gabriel's estate have been kept at the Leo Baeck Institute in New York since 1979.
