= NICD =

NICD may refer to:

- National Institute for Communicable Diseases, South Africa, part of the National Health Laboratory Service
- Nickel–cadmium battery (NiCd), a rechargeable battery
- South Shore Line (NICTD) (reporting mark NICD), an interurban commuter rail line in Chicago and northern Indiana
- N-formylmaleamate deformylase, an enzyme
