= C4H5NO3 =

The molecular formula C_{4}H_{5}NO_{3} (molar mass : 115.088 g/mol) may refer to:

- N-Hydroxysuccinimide
- Maleamic acid
