= C9H11N5O4 =

The molecular formula C_{9}H_{11}N_{5}O_{4} may refer to:

- Eritadenine, a chemical compound found in shiitake mushrooms
- Neopterin, a catabolic product of guanosine triphosphate
