= NICF =

NICF may refer to:

- Northern Ireland Cycling Federation
- Maleamate amidohydrolase, an enzyme
