= Maleimide hydrolase =

Class of enzymes

Identifiers
- EC no.: 3.5.2.16

Databases
- BRENDA: enzyme data
- ExPASy: NiceZyme view
- KEGG: enzyme entry
- MetaCyc: metabolic pathway
- Rhea: reactions
- PDB structures: RCSB PDB PDBe PDBsum
- Gene Ontology: AmiGO / QuickGO
Search
- PMC: articles
- PubMed: articles
- NCBI: proteins

Maleimide hydrolase (EC 3.5.2.16) is an enzyme characterised from a Blastobacter species that catalyzes the hydrolysis of maleimide to maleamic acid:

maleimide
H_{2}O
maleamic acid

This is a hydrolase, one acting on carbon-nitrogen bonds other than peptide bonds, specifically in cyclic amides. The systematic name of this enzyme class is cyclic-imide amidohydrolase (decyclizing). Other names in common use include imidase, cyclic imide hydrolase, and cyclic-imide amidohydrolase (decyclicizing) [misprint].
