= Diacetamide =

- 11o

Names
- IUPAC name N-Acetylacetamide
- Other names bisacetylamine, N-acetylacetamide, diacetylamine

Identifiers
CAS Number	625-77-4
3D model (JSmol)	Interactive image
ChEMBL	ChEMBL18986
ChemSpider	11760
EC Number	210-910-1
PubChem CID	12263
UNII	M3GE4E3PRK
CompTox Dashboard (EPA)	DTXSID10211549
- InChI: InChI=1S/C4H7NO2/c1-3(6)5-4(2)7/h1-2H3,(H,5,6,7) Key: ZSBDPRIWBYHIAF-UHFFFAOYSA-N
- SMILES: CC(=O)NC(=O)C

Properties
Chemical formula	C_{4}H_{7}NO_{2}
Molar mass	101.105 g·mol^{−1}
Appearance	white solid
Density	1.215 g/cm^{3}
Melting point	79 °C (174 °F; 352 K)
Boiling point	220–222 °C (428–432 °F; 493–495 K)
- Except where otherwise noted, data are given for materials in their standard state (at 25 °C [77 °F], 100 kPa). Infobox references

Diacetamide is an organic compound with the formula HN(COCH_{3})_{2}. It can be classified as an imide. It is a white solid.

Diacetamide can be prepared by acetylation of acetamide. The compound serves as a bidentate O,O chelating ligand for a variety of metal ions.
