= Tert-Butyloxycarbonyl protecting group =

Protecting group used in organic synthesis

tert-Butyloxycarbonyl protecting group

The tert-butyloxycarbonyl protecting group or tert-butoxycarbonyl protecting group (BOC group) is an acid-labile protecting group used in organic synthesis.

The BOC group can be added to amines under aqueous conditions using di-tert-butyl dicarbonate in the presence of a base such as sodium hydroxide:

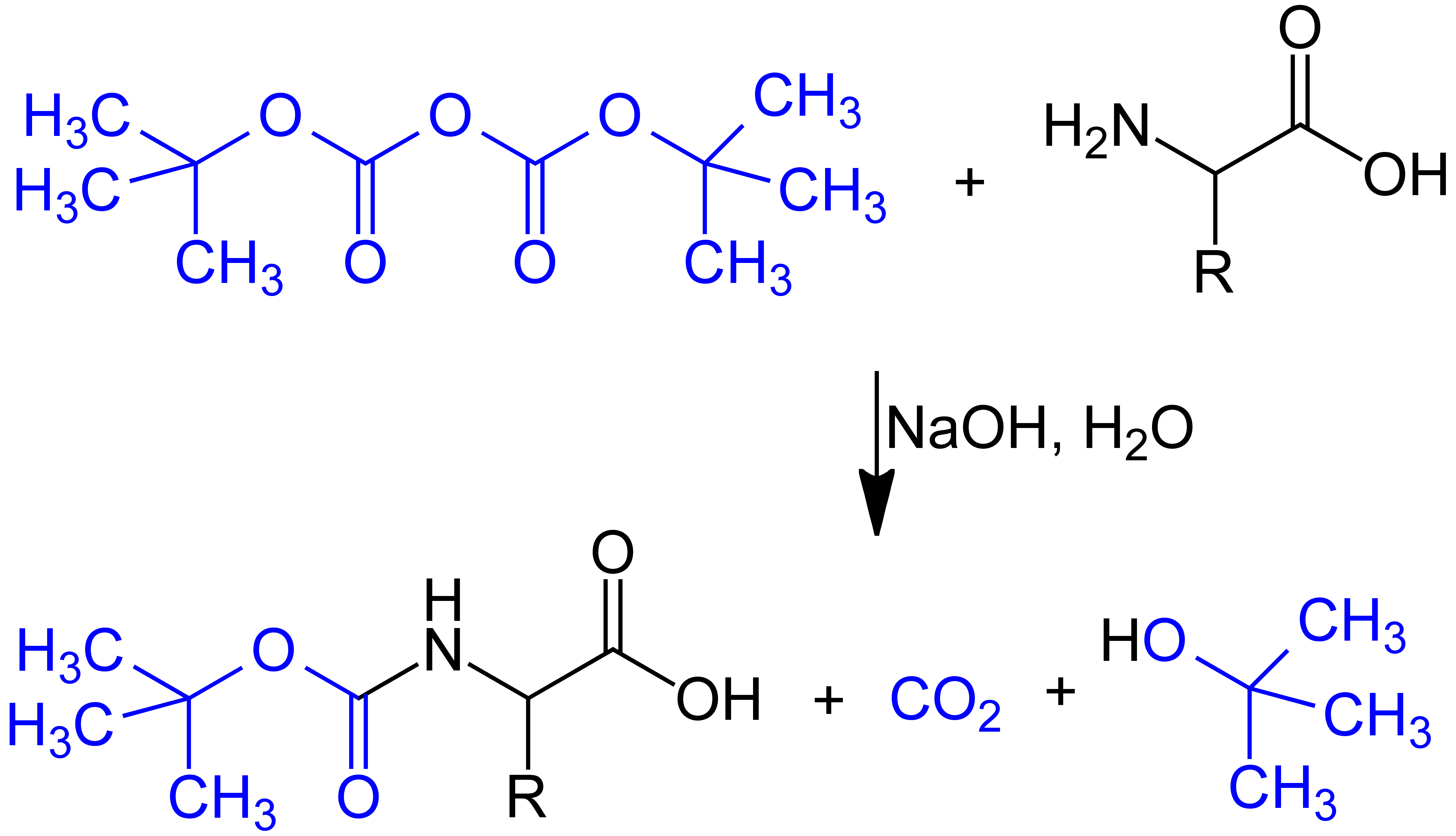

Protection of amines can also be accomplished in acetonitrile solution using 4-dimethylaminopyridine (DMAP) as the base.

Removal of the BOC group in amino acids can be accomplished with strong acids such as trifluoroacetic acid in dichloromethane, or with HCl in methanol. A complication may be the tendency of the t-butyl cation intermediate to alkylate other nucleophiles; scavengers such as anisole or thioanisole may be used. Selective cleavage of the N-Boc group in the presence of other protecting groups is possible when using AlCl_{3}.

Sequential treatment with trimethylsilyl iodide then methanol can also be used for Boc deprotection, especially where other deprotection methods are too harsh for the substrate. The mechanism involves silylation of the carbonyl oxygen and elimination of tert-butyl iodide (1), methanolysis of the silyl ester to the carbamic acid (2) and finally decarboxylation to the amine (3).

R_{2}NCO_{2}tBu + Me_{3}SiI → R_{2}NCO_{2}SiMe_{3} + tBuI	1

R_{2}NCO_{2}SiMe_{3} + MeOH → R_{2}NCO_{2}H + MeOSiMe_{3}	2

R_{2}NCO_{2}H → R_{2}NH + CO_{2}	3

== Amine protection ==
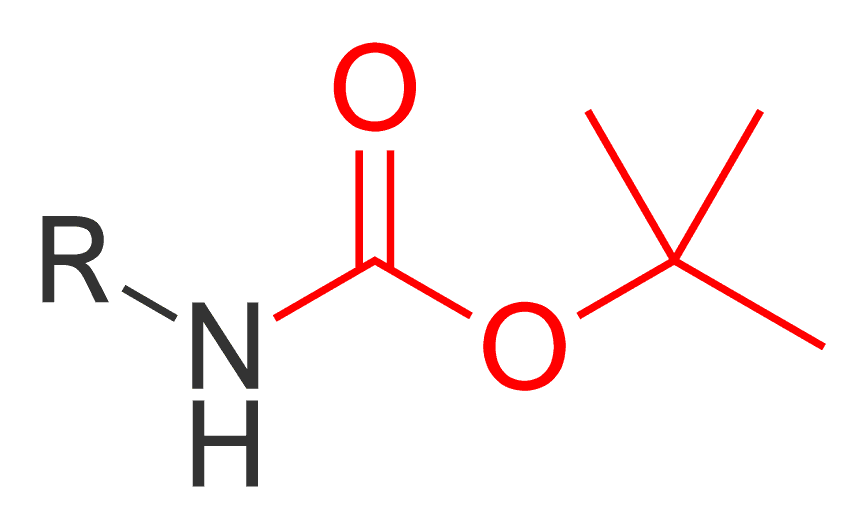
An amine bound to a tert-Boc protecting group

The tert-butyloxycarbonyl (Boc) group is used as a protecting group for amines in organic synthesis.

=== Common amine protection methods ===
- Simple rapid stirring of a mixture of the amine and di-tert-butyl dicarbonate (Boc_{2}O) suspended in water at ambient temperature, an example of an on-water reaction.
- Heating a mixture of the amine to be protected and di-tert-butyl dicarbonate in tetrahydrofuran (THF) at 40 °C
- Add the amine to sodium hydroxide and di-tert-butyl dicarbonate in water and THF at 0 °C then warm to ambient temperature.
- Heating a mixture of the amine to be protected and di-tert-butyl dicarbonate in a biphasic mixture of chloroform and aqueous sodium bicarbonate at reflux for 90 minutes.
- Add the amine to di-tert-butyl dicarbonate, 4-dimethylaminopyridine (DMAP), and acetonitrile (MeCN) at ambient temperature

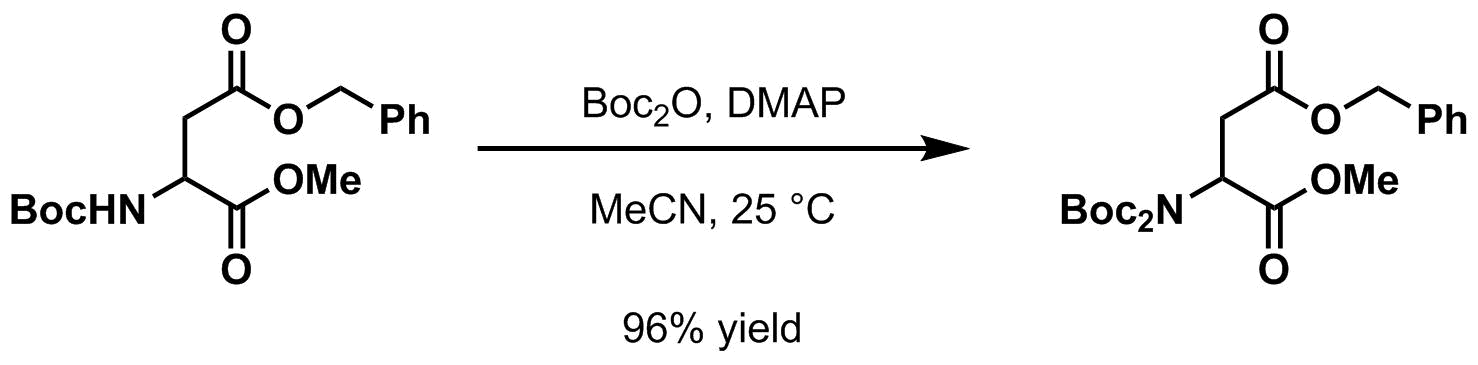

BOC-protected amines are prepared using the reagent di-tert-butyl-iminodicarboxylate. Upon deprotonation, this reagent affords a doubly BOC-protected source of NH^{−}_{2}, which can be N-alkylated. The approach is complementary to the Gabriel synthesis of amines.

=== Common amine deprotection methods ===
- Mix the protected carbamate to be deprotected with 3 M hydrochloric acid (HCl) in ethyl acetate for 30 min at ambient temperature
- Heat the carbamate in a mixture of aqueous hydrochloric acid and toluene at 65 °C
- Dissolving desired protected compound in a 50/50 mix of dichloromethane and trifluoroacetic acid

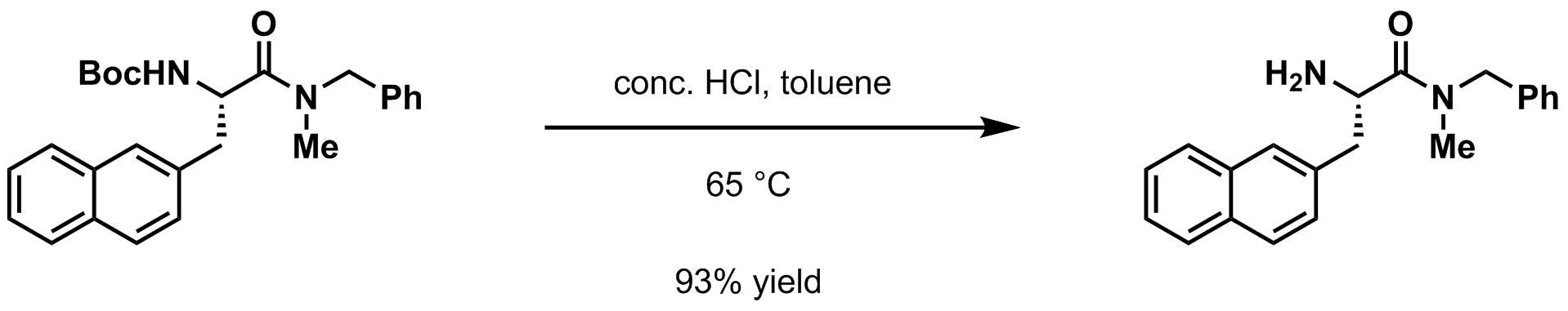
