= Phthalimide =

Organic compound

- skeletal formula of the phthalimide molecule

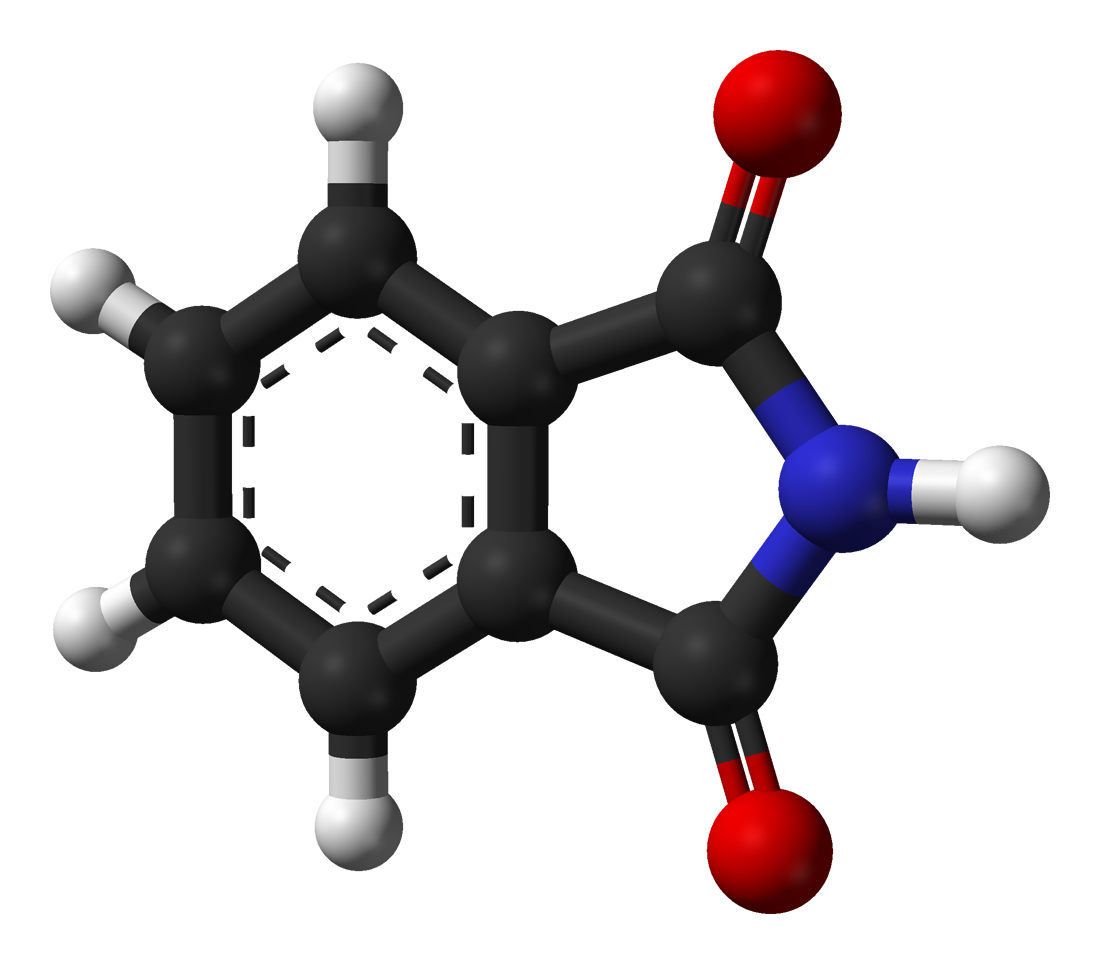
- ball-and-stick model of the phthalimide molecule

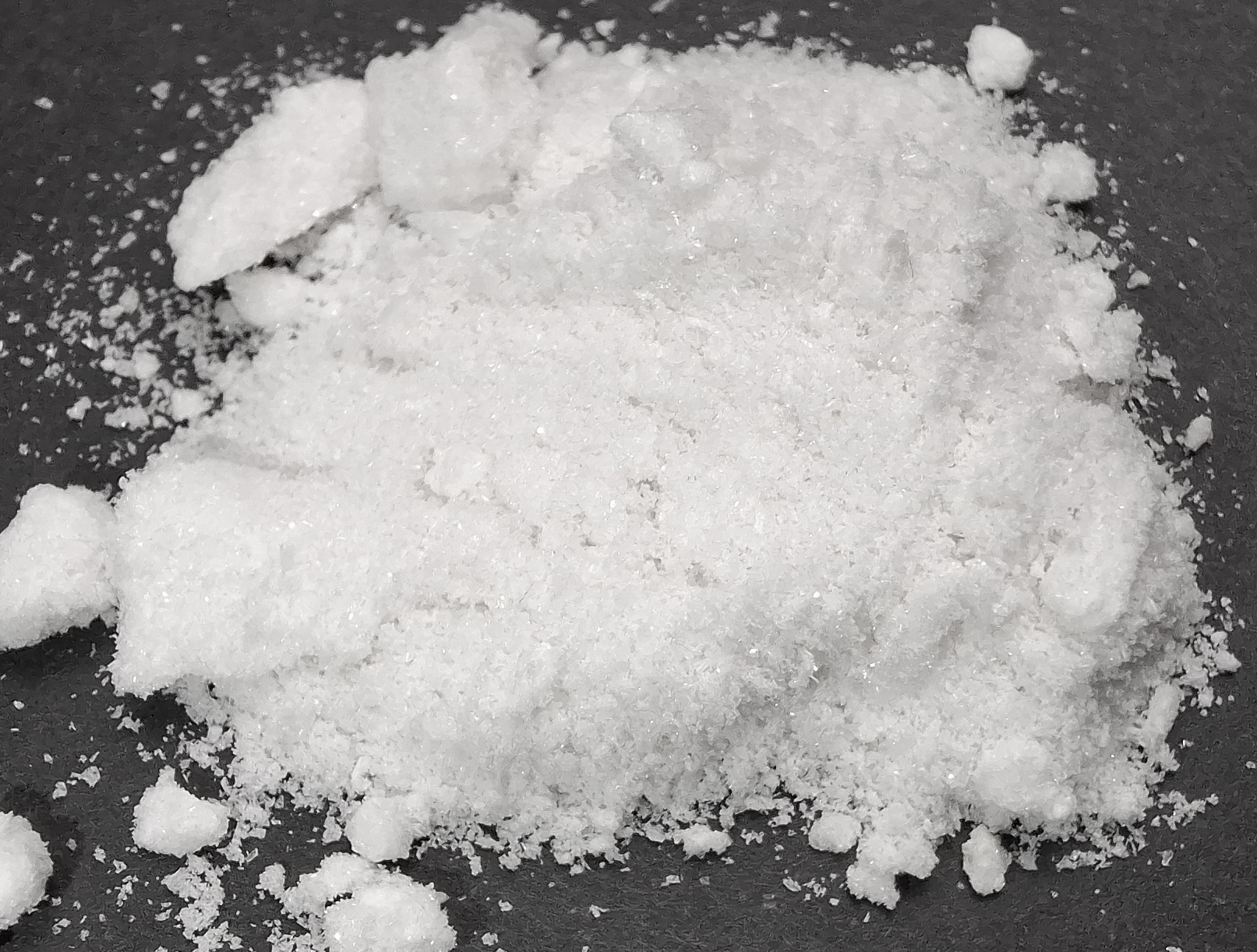
- Phthalimide powder

Names
- Preferred IUPAC name 1H-Isoindole-1,3(2H)-dione
- Other names 1,3-Dioxoisoindoline; Phthalimidoyl (deprotonated)

Identifiers
CAS Number	85-41-6
3D model (JSmol)	Interactive image
ChEBI	CHEBI:38817
ChEMBL	ChEMBL277294
ChemSpider	6550
ECHA InfoCard	100.001.458
PubChem CID	6809
UNII	1J6PQ7YI80
CompTox Dashboard (EPA)	DTXSID3026514
- InChI: InChI=1S/C8H5NO2/c10-7-5-3-1-2-4-6(5)8(11)9-7/h1-4H,(H,9,10,11) Key: XKJCHHZQLQNZHY-UHFFFAOYSA-N; InChI=1/C8H5NO2/c10-7-5-3-1-2-4-6(5)8(11)9-7/h1-4H,(H,9,10,11) Key: XKJCHHZQLQNZHY-UHFFFAOYAS
- SMILES: O=C2c1ccccc1C(=O)N2

Properties
Chemical formula	C_{8}H_{5}NO_{2}
Molar mass	147.133 g·mol^{−1}
Appearance	White solid
Melting point	238 °C (460 °F; 511 K)
Boiling point	336 °C (637 °F; 609 K) sublimes
Solubility in water	<0.1 g/100 ml (19.5 °C)
Acidity (pK_{a})	8.3
Basicity (pK_{b})	5.7
Magnetic susceptibility (χ)	−78.4×10^{−6} cm^{3}/mol

Related compounds
Related Amides	Maleimide
Related compounds	Phthalic anhydride
- Except where otherwise noted, data are given for materials in their standard state (at 25 °C [77 °F], 100 kPa). verify (what is ?) Infobox references

Phthalimide is the organic compound with the formula C_{6}H_{4}(CO)_{2}NH. It is the imide derivative of phthalic anhydride. It is a sublimable white solid that is slightly soluble in water but more so upon addition of base. It is used as a precursor to other organic compounds as a masked source of ammonia.

== Uses ==
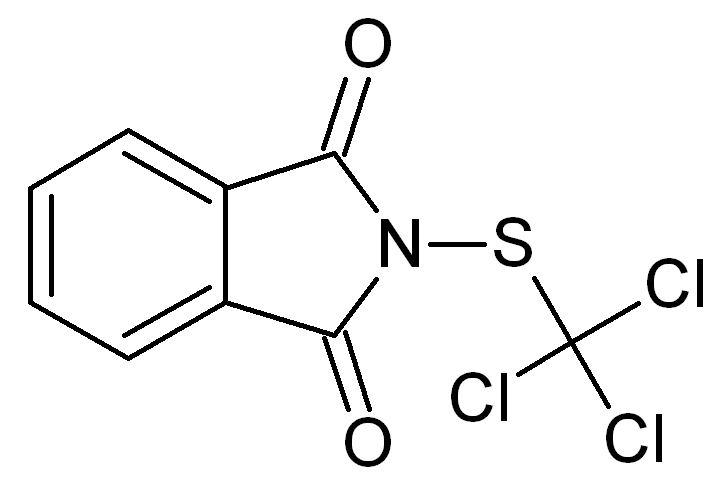
Folpet, a phthalimide, is a commercial fungicide.

Phthalimide is used as a precursor to anthranilic acid, a precursor to azo dyes and saccharin.

Alkyl phthalimides are useful precursors to amines in chemical synthesis, especially in peptide synthesis where they are used "to block both hydrogens and avoid racemization of the substrates". Alkyl halides can be converted to the N-alkylphthalimide:

C_{6}H_{4}(CO)_{2}NH + RX + NaOH → C_{6}H_{4}(CO)_{2}NR + NaX + H_{2}O

The amine is commonly liberated using hydrazine:

C_{6}H_{4}(CO)_{2}NR + N_{2}H_{4} → C_{6}H_{4}(CO)_{2}N_{2}H_{2} + RNH_{2}

Alkyl amines can also be used.

Some examples of phthalimide-containing drugs include thalidomide, amphotalide, taltrimide, talmetoprim, and apremilast. With a trichloromethylthio substituent, a phthalimide-derived fungicide is Folpet.

== Reactivity ==
The high acidity of the imido N-H is the result of the pair of flanking electron-withdrawing carbonyl groups. Both sodium phthalimide and potassium phthalimide are well known. The latter can be made by reaction of phthalimide with potassium carbonate or potassium hydroxide.. The potassium salt is used in the Gabriel synthesis of primary amines.

== Preparation ==
Phthalimide can be prepared by heating phthalic anhydride with alcoholic ammonia giving 95–97% yield. Alternatively, it may be prepared by treating the anhydride with ammonium carbonate or urea. It can also be produced by ammoxidation of o-xylene.

Synthesis of phthalimide from phthalic anhydride

Phthalimide can also be prepared from phthalic acid by the following process:

Synthesis of phthalimide from phthalic acid

== Natural occurrence ==
Kladnoite is a natural mineral analog of phthalimide. It is very rarely found among a few burning coal fire sites.

== Safety ==
Phthalimide has low acute toxicity with LD_{50} (rat, oral) of greater than 5,000 mg/kg.

== General reading ==
- Vollhardt, K. Peter C.; Schore, Neil Eric (2002). Organic Chemistry: Structure and Function (4th ed.). New York: W. H. Freeman. ISBN 978-0-7167-4374-3.
- Finar, Ivor Lionel (1973). Organic Chemistry. Vol. 1 (6th ed.). London: Longman. ISBN 0-582-44221-4.
