= N-formylmaleamate deformylase =

Class of enzymes

Identifiers
- EC no.: 3.5.1.106

Databases
- BRENDA: enzyme data
- ExPASy: NiceZyme view
- KEGG: enzyme entry
- MetaCyc: metabolic pathway
- Rhea: reactions
- PDB structures: RCSB PDB PDBe PDBsum
Search
- PMC: articles
- PubMed: articles
- NCBI: proteins

N-formylmaleamate deformylase (EC 3.5.1.106, NicD) is an enzyme characterised from Pseudomonas putida with systematic name N-formylmaleamic acid amidohydrolase. It catalyses the hydrolysis of N-formylmaleamic acid to maleamic acid and formic acid:

N-formylmaleamic acid
H_{2}O
HCO_{2}H
maleamic acid

The reaction is a late step in the aerobic catabolism of nicotinic acid.
