= Di-tert-butyl-iminodicarboxylate =

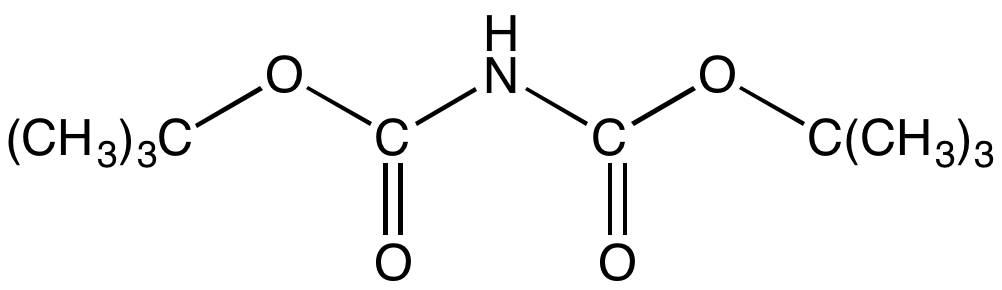

Names
- Preferred IUPAC name Di-tert-butyl 2-imidodicarbonate
- Other names HN(Boc)_{2}; Bis-Boc amine

Identifiers
| CAS Number | 51779-32-9 |
| 3D model (JSmol) | Interactive image |
| ChemSpider | 246393 |
| PubChem CID | 279800 |
| UNII | 85M4Q7458H |
| CompTox Dashboard (EPA) | DTXSID70299500 |
- InChI: InChI=1S/C10H19NO4/c1-9(2,3)14-7(12)11-8(13)15-10(4,5)6/h1-6H3,(H,11,12,13) Key: XCAQIUOFDMREBA-UHFFFAOYSA-N
- SMILES: CC(C)(C)OC(=O)NC(=O)OC(C)(C)C

Properties
| Chemical formula | C_{10}H_{19}NO_{4} |
| Molar mass | 217.265 g·mol^{−1} |
| Appearance | White solid |
| Melting point | 119–121 °C (246–250 °F; 392–394 K) |
- Except where otherwise noted, data are given for materials in their standard state (at 25 °C [77 °F], 100 kPa). Infobox references

Di-tert-butyl-iminodicarboxylate is an organic compound that can be described with the formula [(CH_{3})_{3}COC(O)]_{2}NH. It is a white solid that is soluble in organic solvents. The compound is used as a reagent for the preparation of primary amines from alkyl halides. It was popularized as an alternative to the Gabriel synthesis for the same conversion. Amines can also be prepared from alcohols by dehydration using the Mitsunobu reaction.

In the usual implementation the reagent is deprotonated to give the potassium salt, which is N-alkylated. The Boc protecting groups are subsequently removed under acidic conditions.
