= Gabriel synthesis =

Method for the synthesis of primary amines

Named after	Siegmund Gabriel
Reaction type	Substitution reaction

Identifiers
Organic Chemistry Portal	gabriel-synthesis
RSC ontology ID	RXNO:0000103

The Gabriel synthesis is a chemical reaction that transforms primary alkyl halides into primary amines. Traditionally, the reaction uses potassium phthalimide. The reaction is named after the German chemist Siegmund Gabriel.

The Gabriel reaction has been generalized to include the alkylation of sulfonamides and imides, followed by deprotection, to obtain amines (see Alternative Gabriel reagents).

The alkylation of ammonia is often an unselective and inefficient route to amines. In the Gabriel method, phthalimide anion is employed as a surrogate of H_{2}N^{−}.

== Traditional Gabriel synthesis ==
In this method, the sodium or potassium salt of phthalimide is N-alkylated with a primary alkyl halide to give the corresponding N-alkylphthalimide. This step is an S_{N}2 reaction; the Gabriel synthesis generally fails with secondary alkyl halides unless they are especially reactive. Upon workup by acidic hydrolysis the primary amine is liberated as the amine salt. Alternatively the workup may be via the Ing–Manske procedure, involving reaction with hydrazine. This method produces a precipitate of phthalhydrazide along with the primary amine:

The acid-hydrolysis technique often produces low yields or side products. Separation of phthalhydrazide byproduct of the hydrazine technique can be challenging. For these reasons, other methods for liberating the amine from the phthalimide have been developed. Even with the use of the hydrazinolysis method, the Gabriel method suffers from relatively harsh conditions.

== Alternative Gabriel reagents ==
Many alternative reagents have been developed to complement the use of phthalimides. Most such reagents (e.g. the sodium salt of saccharin and di-tert-butyl-iminodicarboxylate) are electronically similar to the phthalimide salts, consisting of imido nucleophiles. In terms of their advantages, these reagents hydrolyze more readily, extend the reactivity to secondary alkyl halides, and allow the production of secondary amines.

== See also ==
- Robinson–Gabriel synthesis – also developed by Siegmund Gabriel
- Delépine reaction – primary amines from benzyl or alkyl halides
