= Maleamate amidohydrolase =

Class of enzymes

Identifiers
- EC no.: 3.5.1.107

Databases
- BRENDA: enzyme data
- ExPASy: NiceZyme view
- KEGG: enzyme entry
- MetaCyc: metabolic pathway
- Rhea: reactions
- PDB structures: RCSB PDB PDBe PDBsum
Search
- PMC: articles
- PubMed: articles
- NCBI: proteins

Maleamate amidohydrolase (EC 3.5.1.107, NicF) is an enzyme characterised from Pseudomonas putida with systematic name maleamate amidohydrolase. It catalyses the hydrolysis of maleamic acid to maleic acid and ammonia:

maleamic acid
H_{2}O
NH_{3}
maleic acid

The reaction is a late step in the aerobic catabolism of nicotinic acid.
