= Showdomycin =

Antibiotic

Names
- IUPAC name (1S)-1,4-Anhydro-1-(2,5-dioxo-2,5-dihydro-1H-pyrrol-3-yl)-D-ribitol
- Other names: 2-β-D-Ribofuranosylmaleimide; 3-β-D-Ribofuranosyl-1H-pyrrole-2,5-dione

Identifiers
CAS Number	16755-07-0
3D model (JSmol)	Interactive image
ChEBI	CHEBI:226519
ChEMBL	ChEMBL5207810
ChemSpider	26074
MeSH	Showdomycin
PubChem CID	28032
UNII	E1V8315QHY
CompTox Dashboard (EPA)	DTXSID001043162
- InChI: InChI=1S/C9H11NO6/c11-2-4-6(13)7(14)8(16-4)3-1-5(12)10-9(3)15/h1,4,6-8,11,13-14H,2H2,(H,10,12,15)/t4-,6-,7-,8+/m1/s1 Key: FFLUMYXAPXARJP-JBBNEOJLSA-N
- SMILES: C1=C(C(=O)NC1=O)[C@H]2[C@@H]([C@@H]([C@H](O2)CO)O)O

Properties
Chemical formula	C_{9}H_{11}NO_{6}
Molar mass	229.188 g·mol^{−1}
Melting point	153–154 °C (307–309 °F; 426–427 K)
- Except where otherwise noted, data are given for materials in their standard state (at 25 °C [77 °F], 100 kPa). Infobox references

Showdomycin is a nucleoside antibiotic derived from Streptomyces showdoensis. It is known for its antitumor and antimicrobial properties. Showdomycin was first isolated in the 1960s and has since been studied for its potential applications in cancer research and microbiology.

== Discovery and history ==
Showdomycin was first discovered in 1964 by Japanese researchers during a screening of Streptomyces species for novel antibiotics. It was isolated from Streptomyces showdoensis, a soil bacterium, and its structure was elucidated shortly thereafter. The compound gained attention for its unusual structure, which includes a maleimide ring fused to a ribose sugar, distinguishing it from other nucleoside antibiotics.

== Chemical structure ==
Showdomycin is a C-nucleoside, meaning the sugar is directly bonded to a carbon atom of the maleimide ring rather than a nitrogen atom, as seen in typical nucleosides. Its chemical formula is C_{9}H_{11}NO_{6}, and its systematic name is 1-β-D-ribofuranosyl-1H-pyrrole-2,5-dione. The maleimide moiety is responsible for its reactivity, particularly its ability to act as a Michael acceptor in biochemical reactions. It displays a high similarity with uridine and pseudouridine.

== Mechanism of action ==
Showdomycin exhibits its biological activity through several mechanisms:

- Antitumor activity: Showdomycin and its derivatives act as uridine mimics, thereby delaying RNA extension and hence RNA synthysis. This makes it effective against rapidly dividing cancer cells.
- Antimicrobial activity: It inhibits the growth of various fungi and bacteria, especially Streptococcus hemolyticus and Streptococcus pyogenes by disrupting essential metabolic pathways.
- Inhibition of enzymes: It is a sulfhydryl reactive agent and acts as an inhibitor of certain enzymes, particularly those with thiol groups, by forming covalent bonds with cysteine residues.

== Applications ==
Showdomycin is a compound commonly used in biochemical research to investigate enzyme mechanisms and protein interactions. It works by selectively modifying thiol groups, making it a valuable tool for studying protein structure and function. Although it has not been developed into a commercial drug, researchers have explored its potential therapeutic uses. Preclinical studies have shown that showdomycin possesses both antitumor and antimicrobial properties. It has demonstrated effectiveness against certain antibiotic-resistant pathogens, making it a potential candidate for future drug development. However its use in therapeutic applications is limited by its lack of selectivity, which can lead to adverse effects on healthy cells.
