= Sodium phthalimide =

Identifiers
CAS Number	33081-78-6
3D model (JSmol)	Interactive image
ChemSpider	7991079
PubChem CID	11008329
- InChI: InChI=1S/C8H5NO2.Na/c10-7-5-3-1-2-4-6(5)8(11)9-7;/h1-4H,(H,9,10,11);/q;+1/p-1 Key: WUPVYJJCKYSGCR-UHFFFAOYSA-M
- SMILES: C1=CC=C2C(=C1)C(=O)[N-]C2=O.[Na+]

Properties
Chemical formula	C_{8}H_{4}NNaO_{2}
Molar mass	169.115 g·mol^{−1}
Appearance	yellow solid
- Except where otherwise noted, data are given for materials in their standard state (at 25 °C [77 °F], 100 kPa). Infobox references

Sodium phthalimide is an organic compound with formula C_{6}H_{4}(CO)_{2}NNa. It is the sodium salt of phthalimide. It is a pale yellow solid. It can be prepared by treating phthalimide with sodium hydroxide. The related salt potassium phthalimide is a more common reagent in the laboratory.

This compound is an intermediate in the synthesis of anthranilic acid from phthalic anhydride.
