= Streptomyces showdoensis =

Scientific classification
- Domain: Bacteria
- Kingdom: Bacillati
- Phylum: Actinomycetota
- Class: Actinomycetes
- Order: Streptomycetales
- Family: Streptomycetaceae
- Genus: Streptomyces
- Species: S. showdoensis

Binomial name
- Streptomyces showdoensis Nishimura et al. 1964

Type strain
- ATCC 15105, BCRC 11868, CBS 718.72, CCRC 11868, CGMCC 4.1757, DSM 40504, IFO 13417, ISP 5504, JCM 4830, NBRC 13417, NRRL B-12430, NRRL-ISP 5504, RIA 1378, Shionogi Z-452, VKM Ac-1219, VKMAc-1219, Z-452

Species of bacterium

Streptomyces showdoensis is a bacterium species from the genus Streptomyces which has been isolated from soil in Shōdoshima, Japan. Streptomyces showdoensis produces terferol, actinomycin and showdomycin.

== See also ==
- List of Streptomyces species
