= Pencolide =

Names
- Preferred IUPAC name (2Z)-2-(3-Methyl-2,5-dioxo-2,5-dihydro-1H-pyrrol-1-yl)but-2-enoic acid

Identifiers
CAS Number	61464-52-6
3D model (JSmol)	Interactive image
ChemSpider	24022634
PubChem CID	38353904
UNII	1D24950547
CompTox Dashboard (EPA)	DTXSID601045435
- InChI: InChI=1S/C9H9NO4/c1-3-6(9(13)14)10-7(11)4-5(2)8(10)12/h3-4H,1-2H3,(H,13,14)/b6-3- Key: NFDKQFGUQFNACT-UTCJRWHESA-N; InChI=1/C9H9NO4/c1-3-6(9(13)14)10-7(11)4-5(2)8(10)12/h3-4H,1-2H3,(H,13,14)/b6-3- Key: NFDKQFGUQFNACT-UTCJRWHEBL
- SMILES: C/C=C(/C(=O)O)\N1C(=O)C=C(C1=O)C

Properties
Chemical formula	C_{9}H_{9}NO_{4}
Molar mass	195.174 g·mol^{−1}
- Except where otherwise noted, data are given for materials in their standard state (at 25 °C [77 °F], 100 kPa). Infobox references

Pencolide is a maleimide isolate of Penicillium and seaweed endophytic fungi.
