= Robinson–Gabriel synthesis =

Organic reaction

The Robinson–Gabriel synthesis is an organic reaction in which a 2-acylamino-ketone reacts intramolecularly followed by a dehydration to give an oxazole. A cyclodehydrating agent is needed to catalyze the reaction It is named after Sir Robert Robinson and Siegmund Gabriel who described the reaction in 1909 and 1910, respectively.

The Robinson–Gabriel synthesis

The 2-acylamino-ketone starting material can be synthesized using the Dakin–West reaction.

== Modifications ==
Recently, a solid-phase version of the Robinson–Gabriel synthesis has been described. The reaction requires trifluoroacetic anhydride to be used as the cyclodehydrating agent in ethereal solvent and the 2-acylamidoketone be linked by the nitrogen atom to a benzhydrylic-type linker.

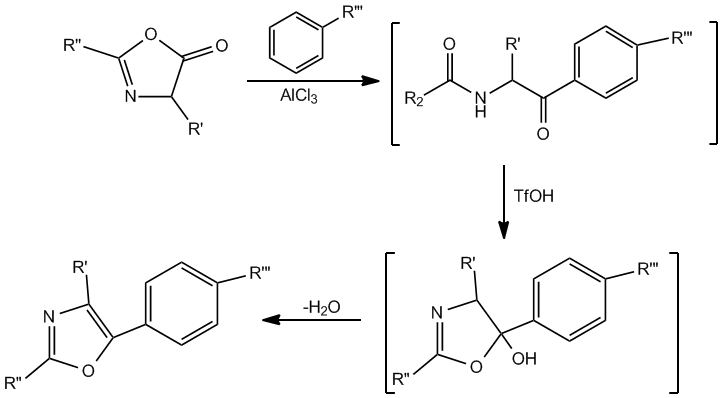
One-pot synthesis of oxazoles using oxazolone templates as described by Keni et al.

A one-pot diversity-oriented synthesis has been developed via a Friedel-Crafts/Robinson–Gabriel synthesis using a general oxazolone template. The combination of aluminum chloride as the Friedel–Crafts Lewis acid and trifluoromethanesulfonic acid as the Robinson-Gabriel cyclodehydrating agent were determined to generate the desired products.

A popular extension of the Robinson-Gabriel cyclodehydration has been reported by Wipf et al. to allow the synthesis of substituted oxazoles from readily available amino acid derivatives. This is achieved through the side-chain oxidation of β-keto amides with the Dess-Martin reagent followed by the cyclodehydration of intermediate β-keto amides with triphenylphosphine, iodine, and triethylamine.

Additionally, a coupled Ugi and Robinson–Gabriel synthesis has been reported, beginning with the Ugi reagents and ending with an oxazole core within the molecule. The oxazole is formed from the Ugi intermediate, which is ideal to undergo Robinson-Gabriel cyclodehydration with sulfuric acid.

== Cyclodehydrating agents ==
Many cyclodehydrating agents have been discovered to be of use in the Robinson–Gabriel synthesis. Historically, the dehydration agent is concentrated sulfuric acid. To date, the reaction has been shown to proceed with a variety of other agents including phosphorus pentachloride, phosphorus pentoxide, phosphoryl chloride, thionyl chloride, phosphoric acid-acetic anhydride, polyphosphoric acid, and hydrogen fluoride among others.

== Applications ==
Oxazoles have been found to be common substructures in multiple naturally isolated compounds and have thus garnered attention within the chemical and pharmaceutical community. The Robinson–Gabriel synthesis has been used during multiple studies dealing with molecules that incorporate an oxazole, among them diazonamide A, diazonamide B, bis-phosphine platinum (II) complexes, mycalolide A, (−)-muscoride A.

Eric Biron et al. developed a solid-phase synthesis of 1,3-oxazole-based peptides on solid phase from dipeptides by oxidation of the side-chain followed by Wipf and Miller's cyclodehydration of β-ketoamides described above.

Lilly Research Laboratories has disclosed the structure of a described dual PPARα/γ agonist that has possible beneficial impact on type 2 diabetes. The Robinson-Gabriel cyclodehydration is the second part of a two reaction synthesis of the agonist. Starting with aspartic acid β esters undergoing acylation to differentiate the first substituent, linked to carbon-2, followed by Dakin-West conversion to keto-amide to introduce the second substituent, and ending with the Robinson-Gabriel cyclodehydration at 90 °C for 30 minutes with either phosphorus oxychloride in dimethylformamide or catalytic sulfuric acid in acetic anhydride.
