= 4-Chlorophthalic anhydride =

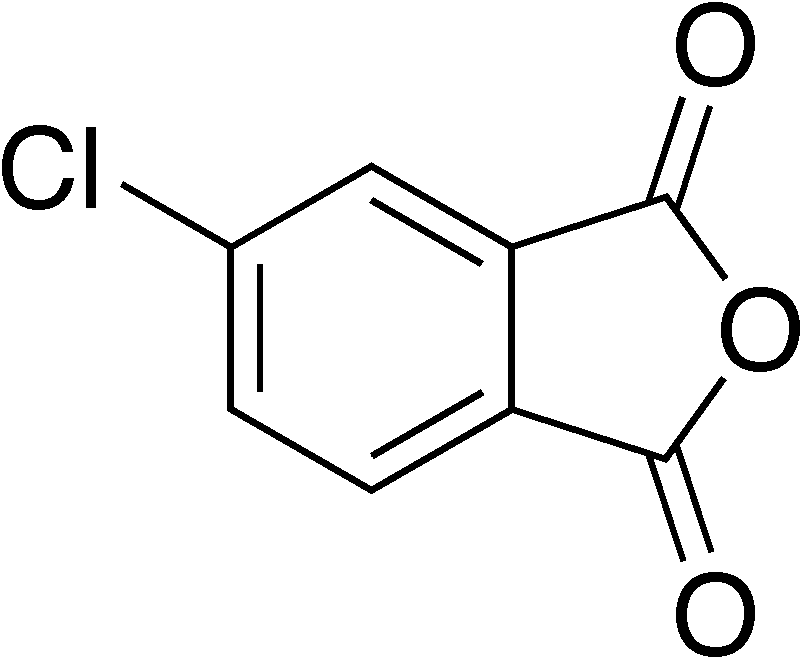

Names
- Preferred IUPAC name 5-Chloro-2-benzofuran-1,3-dione

Identifiers
CAS Number	118-45-6
3D model (JSmol)	Interactive image
ChemSpider	60395
ECHA InfoCard	100.003.866
PubChem CID	67044
UNII	BPI93D0O61
CompTox Dashboard (EPA)	DTXSID30151993
- InChI: InChI=1S/C8H3ClO3/c9-4-1-2-5-6(3-4)8(11)12-7(5)10/h1-3H Key: BTTRMCQEPDPCPA-UHFFFAOYSA-N; InChI=1/C8H3ClO3/c9-4-1-2-5-6(3-4)8(11)12-7(5)10/h1-3H Key: BTTRMCQEPDPCPA-UHFFFAOYAB
- SMILES: Clc1ccc2C(=O)OC(=O)c2c1

Properties
Chemical formula	C_{8}H_{3}ClO_{3}
Molar mass	182.56 g·mol^{−1}
Melting point	~99 °C
- Except where otherwise noted, data are given for materials in their standard state (at 25 °C [77 °F], 100 kPa). verify (what is ?) Infobox references

4-Chlorophthalic anhydride is a monochlorinated aromatic anhydride. It is an isomer of 3-chlorophthalic anhydride and a derivative of phthalic anhydride.

== Properties ==
It has a melting point of around 99 °C. Like most acid anhydrides, it can hydrolyze in the presence of water.

== Production ==
It can be produced by chlorination of phthalic anhydride.

== Applications ==
It may be used to produce herbicides and pesticides, intermediates for active pharmaceutical ingredients and can be used as a monomer for the production of polyimides.
