= Maleimide =

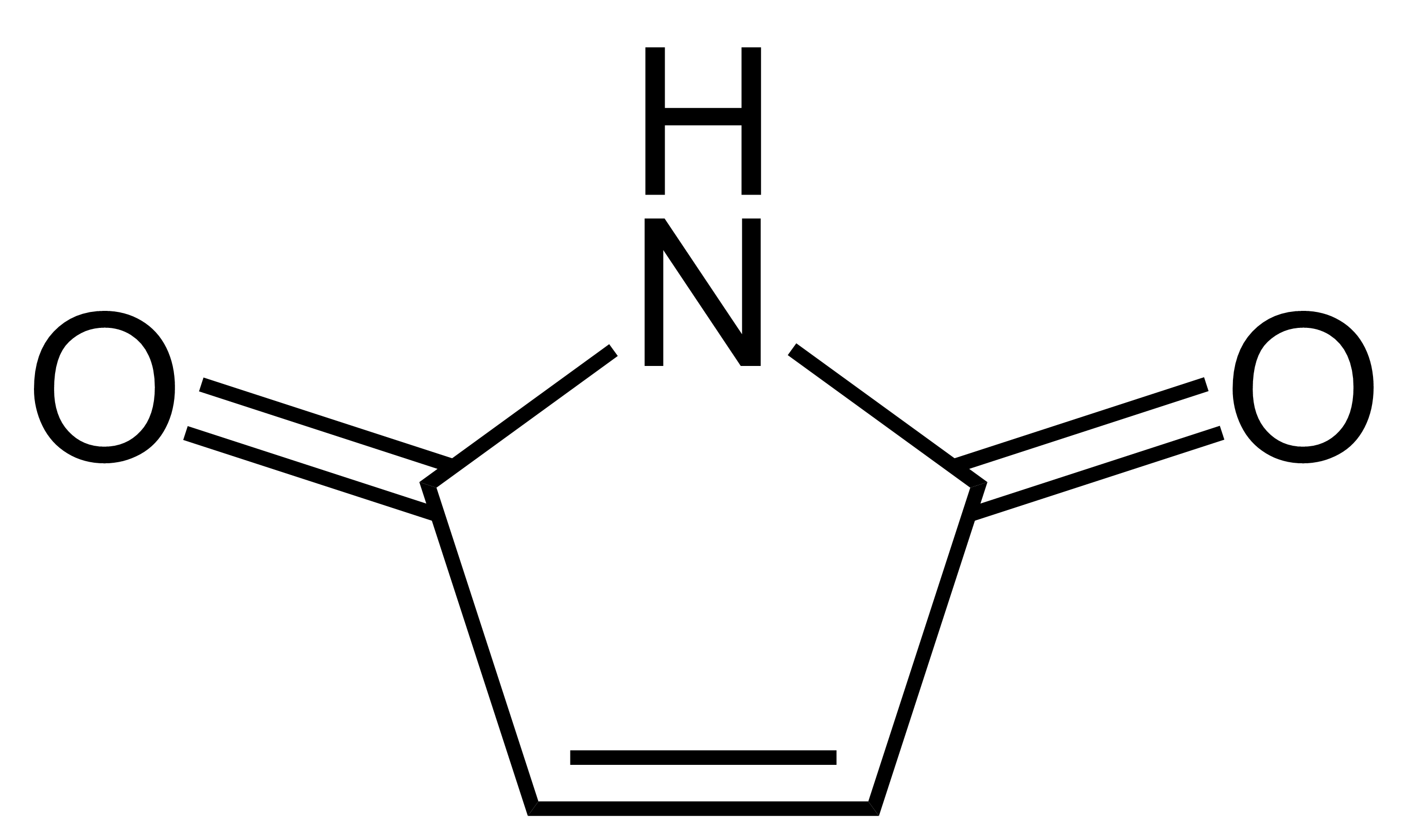

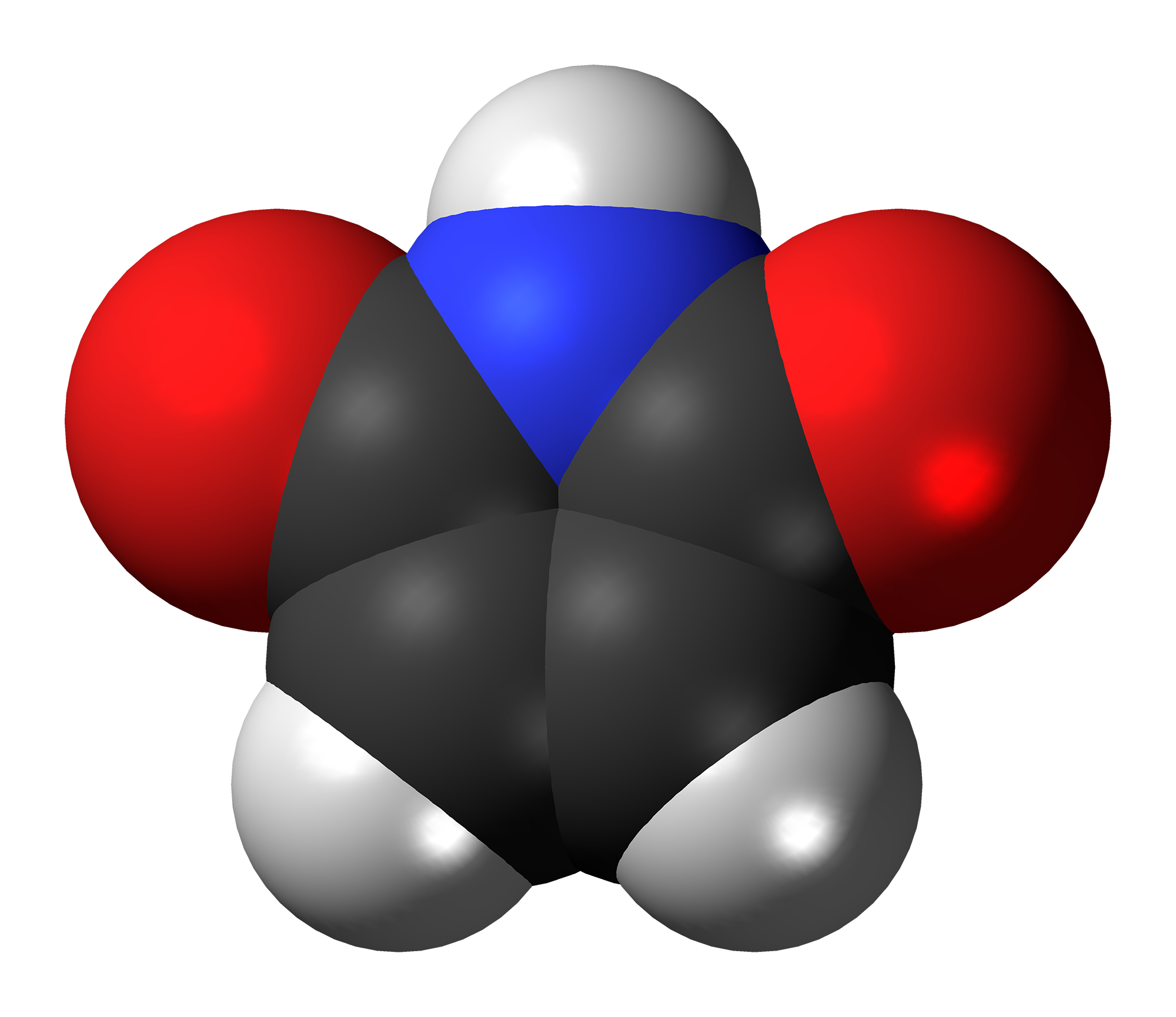

Names
- IUPAC name Maleimide
- Preferred IUPAC name 1H-Pyrrole-2,5-dione
- Other names 2,5-Pyrroledione

Identifiers
CAS Number	541-59-3
3D model (JSmol)	Interactive image
ChEBI	CHEBI:16072
ChEMBL	ChEMBL387762
ChemSpider	10471
ECHA InfoCard	100.007.990
EC Number	208-787-4
KEGG	C07272
PubChem CID	10935
UNII	2519R1UGP8
CompTox Dashboard (EPA)	DTXSID3049417
- InChI: InChI=1S/C4H3NO2/c6-3-1-2-4(7)5-3/h1-2H,(H,5,6,7) Key: PEEHTFAAVSWFBL-UHFFFAOYSA-N; InChI=1/C4H3NO2/c6-3-1-2-4(7)5-3/h1-2H,(H,5,6,7) Key: PEEHTFAAVSWFBL-UHFFFAOYAL
- SMILES: C1=CC(=O)NC1=O

Properties
Chemical formula	C_{4}H_{3}NO_{2}
Molar mass	97.07 g/mol
Melting point	91 to 93 °C (196 to 199 °F; 364 to 366 K)
Solubility in water	organic solvents

Hazards
- GHS labelling
Pictograms	(GHS05: Corrosive) (GHS06: Toxic) (GHS07: Exclamation mark)
Signal word	Danger
Hazard statements	H301, H314, H317
Precautionary statements	P260, P264, P270, P272, P280, P301+P310, P301+P330+P331, P302+P352, P303+P361+P353, P304+P340, P305+P351+P338, P310, P321, P330, P333+P313, P363, P405, P501
- Except where otherwise noted, data are given for materials in their standard state (at 25 °C [77 °F], 100 kPa). verify (what is ?) Infobox references

Maleimide is a chemical compound with the formula H_{2}C_{2}(CO)_{2}NH (see diagram). This unsaturated imide is an important building block in organic synthesis. The name is a contraction of maleic acid and imide, the -C(O)NHC(O)- functional group. Maleimides are also a class of derivatives of the parent maleimide where the NH group is replaced with alkyl or aryl groups such as a methyl or phenyl, respectively. The substituent can also be a small molecule (such as biotin, a fluorescent dye, an oligosaccharide, or a nucleic acid), a reactive group, or a synthetic polymer such as polyethylene glycol. Human hemoglobin chemically modified with maleimide-polyethylene glycol is a blood substitute called MP4.

== Reactions ==
Many analogues of maleimide are prepared by treating maleic anhydride with amines followed by dehydration.

A defining feature of the reactivity of maleimides is their susceptibility to additions across the double bond either by Michael additions or via Diels-Alder reactions. In this context, bismaleimides, compounds with two maleimide groups connected by the nitrogen atoms via a linker, are used as crosslinking reagents in thermoset polymer chemistry. Compounds containing a maleimide group linked with another reactive group, such as an activated N-hydroxysuccinimide ester, are called maleimide heterobifunctional reagents.

Maleimide is weakly acidic, with a pKa estimated at 10.

== Natural maleimides ==
One natural maleimide is the cytotoxic showdomycin from Streptomyces showdoensis, and pencolide from Pe. multicolor – have been reported. Farinomalein was first isolated in 2009 from the entomopathogenic fungus Isaria farinosa (Paecilomyces farinosus) – source H599 (Japan).

== Biotechnology and pharmaceutical applications ==
Maleimide-mediated methodologies are among the most used in bioconjugation. Due to fast reactions and high selectivity towards cysteine residues in proteins, a large variety of maleimide heterobifunctional reagents are used for the preparation of targeted therapeutics, assemblies for studying proteins in their biological context, protein-based microarrays, or proteins immobilisation. For instance, antibody-drug conjugates, are constituted of three main components: a monoclonal antibody, a cytotoxic drug, and a linker molecule often containing a maleimide group, which conjugates the drug through thiols or dienes to the antibody.

Maleimides linked to polyethylene glycol chains are often used as flexible linking molecules to attach proteins to surfaces. The double bond readily undergoes a retro-Michael reaction with the thiol group found on cysteine to form a stable carbon-sulfur bond. Cysteines are often used for site-selective modifications for therapeutic purposes because of the rapid rate of complete bioconjugation with sulfhydryl groups, allowing for higher levels of cytotoxic drug incorporations. Attaching the other end of the polyethylene chain to a bead or solid support allows for easy separation of protein from other molecules in solution, provided these molecules do not also possess thiol groups.

Maleimide-functionalised polymers and liposomes exhibit enhanced ability to adhere to mucosal surfaces (mucoadhesion) due to the reactions with thiol-containing mucins. This could be applicable in the design of dosage forms for transmucosal drug delivery.

The retro-Michael reactions resulting in maleimide-thiol adducts require precise control. The targeting ability of drugs containing the adducts can be easily hindered or lost due to their instability in vivo. The instability is mainly attributed to the formation of the thiosuccinimide which might be involved in thiol exchange reaction with glutathione. B-elimination reaction follows, resulting in off-target activity and a loss of efficacy of the drugs.

No general method exist for stabilizing thioesters, such as thiosuccinimides, so that their off-target effects can be eliminated in drugs. Problems associated with thiol exchange can be mitigated by hydrolyzing the thiosuccinimide, which prevents elimination of the maleimide-thiol bond. The process of ring-opening hydrolysis requires special catalysts and bases, which may not be biocompatible and lead to harsh conditions. Alternatively, cysteines in the positively charged environment or an electron-withdrawing group enable the thiosuccinimide ring to undergo self-hydrolysis.

Another problem with hydrolysis arises if it is applied to N-alkyl-substituted derivatives instead of the N-aryl-substituted derivatives because they hydrolyze at a rate that’s too slow to yield consistently stable adducts.

== Technological applications ==
Analogous to Styrene maleic anhydride, copolymers of maleimides and styrene have been commercialized.

Mono- and bismaleimide-based polymers are used for high temperature applications up to 250 °C (480 °F). Maleimides linked to rubber chains are often used as flexible linking molecules to reinforce rubber in tires. The double bond readily reacts with all hydroxy, amine or thiol groups found on the matrix to form a stable carbon-oxygen, carbon-nitrogen, or carbon-sulfur bond, respectively. These polymers are used in aerospace for high temperature applications of composites. Lockheed Martin's F-22 extensively uses thermoset composites, with bismaleimide and toughened epoxy comprising up to 17.5% and 6.6% of the structure by weight respectively. Lockheed Martin's F-35B (a STOVL version of this US fighter) is reportedly composed of bismaleimide materials, in addition to the use of advanced carbon fiber thermoset polymer matrix composites.

== See also ==
- N-Methylmaleimide
- Succinimide
