= 3-Chlorophthalic anhydride =

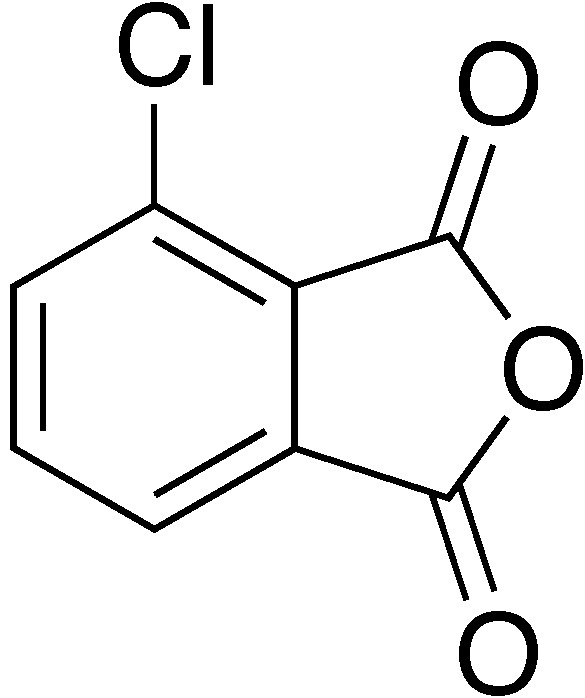

Names
- Preferred IUPAC name 4-Chloro-2-benzofuran-1,3-dione

Identifiers
CAS Number	117-21-5
3D model (JSmol)	Interactive image
ChemSpider	60370
ECHA InfoCard	100.003.800
PubChem CID	67014
UNII	VO7NXT0137
CompTox Dashboard (EPA)	DTXSID10151653
- InChI: InChI=1S/C8H3ClO3/c9-5-3-1-2-4-6(5)8(11)12-7(4)10/h1-3H Key: UERPUZBSSSAZJE-UHFFFAOYSA-N; InChI=1/C8H3ClO3/c9-5-3-1-2-4-6(5)8(11)12-7(4)10/h1-3H Key: UERPUZBSSSAZJE-UHFFFAOYAN
- SMILES: Clc1cccc2c1C(=O)OC2=O

Properties
Chemical formula	C_{8}H_{3}ClO_{3}
Molar mass	182.56 g·mol^{−1}
Melting point	~123 °C
- Except where otherwise noted, data are given for materials in their standard state (at 25 °C [77 °F], 100 kPa). verify (what is ?) Infobox references

3-Chlorophthalic anhydride is a monochlorinated aromatic anhydride. It is an isomer of 4-chlorophthalic anhydride and a derivative of phthalic anhydride.

== Properties ==
3-Chlorophthalic anhydride has a melting point of around 123 °C. It may hydrolize in presence of water.

== Applications ==
3-Chlorophthalic anhydride may be used to produce herbicides and pesticides, intermediates for active pharmaceutical ingredients and can be used as a monomer for the production of polyimides.

== See also ==
- 4-Chlorophthalic anhydride
