= Biotin PEG2 amine =

Names
- IUPAC name N-{2-[2-(2-Aminoethoxy)ethoxy]ethyl}-5-[(3aS,4S,6aR)-2-oxohexahydro-1H-thieno[3,4-d]imidazol-4-yl]pentanamide

Identifiers
CAS Number	138529-46-1
3D model (JSmol)	Interactive image
ChemSpider	9374747
PubChem CID	11199678
UNII	B5M6KM3UCN
CompTox Dashboard (EPA)	DTXSID301030316
- InChI: InChI=1S/C16H30N4O4S/c17-5-7-23-9-10-24-8-6-18-14(21)4-2-1-3-13-15-12(11-25-13)19-16(22)20-15/h12-13,15H,1-11,17H2,(H,18,21)(H2,19,20,22)/t12-,13-,15-/m0/s1 Key: LWISPDYGRSGXME-YDHLFZDLSA-N; InChI=1/C16H30N4O4S/c17-5-7-23-9-10-24-8-6-18-14(21)4-2-1-3-13-15-12(11-25-13)19-16(22)20-15/h12-13,15H,1-11,17H2,(H,18,21)(H2,19,20,22)/t12-,13-,15-/m0/s1 Key: LWISPDYGRSGXME-YDHLFZDLBC
- SMILES: O=C1N[C@@H]2[C@@H](SC[C@@H]2N1)CCCCC(=O)NCCOCCOCCN

Properties
Chemical formula	C_{16}H_{30}N_{4}O_{4}S
Molar mass	374.50 g·mol^{−1}
- Except where otherwise noted, data are given for materials in their standard state (at 25 °C [77 °F], 100 kPa). Infobox references

Biotin PEG2 amine (biotine PEG2 amine) is a water-soluble pegylated biotin derivative used as linker in biotechnology and molecular biology applications.

== Uses ==
Biotin PEG2 amine is used as a linker or cross linker. This allows to attach specific compounds to proteins or to antibodies.

A common use of biotin PEG2 amine is to use EDC and crosslink the amine in the biotin PEG2 amine to carboxyl groups on protein residues that are either aspartate or glutamate or the carboxy-terminus of proteins.

A particular example of use is labeling red cells, which in turn allows for the detection of these labeled cells in small samples using flow cytometry.

== Related compounds ==
- Biotin-PEG2-maleimide
- Biotin-PEG3-amine
- Biotin-PEG4-NHS
