= Phthalic anhydride =

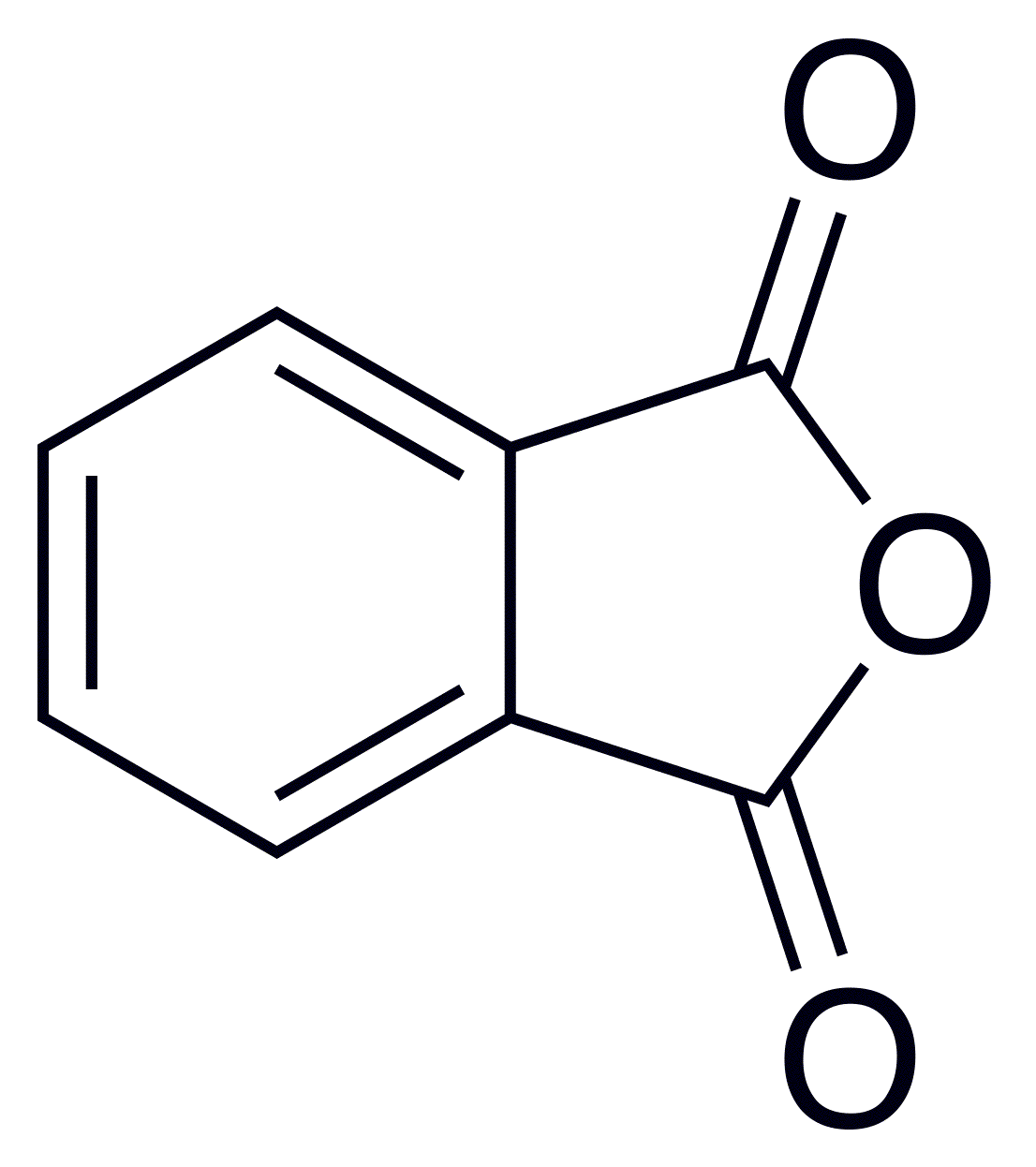
Skeletal formula of phthalic anhydride
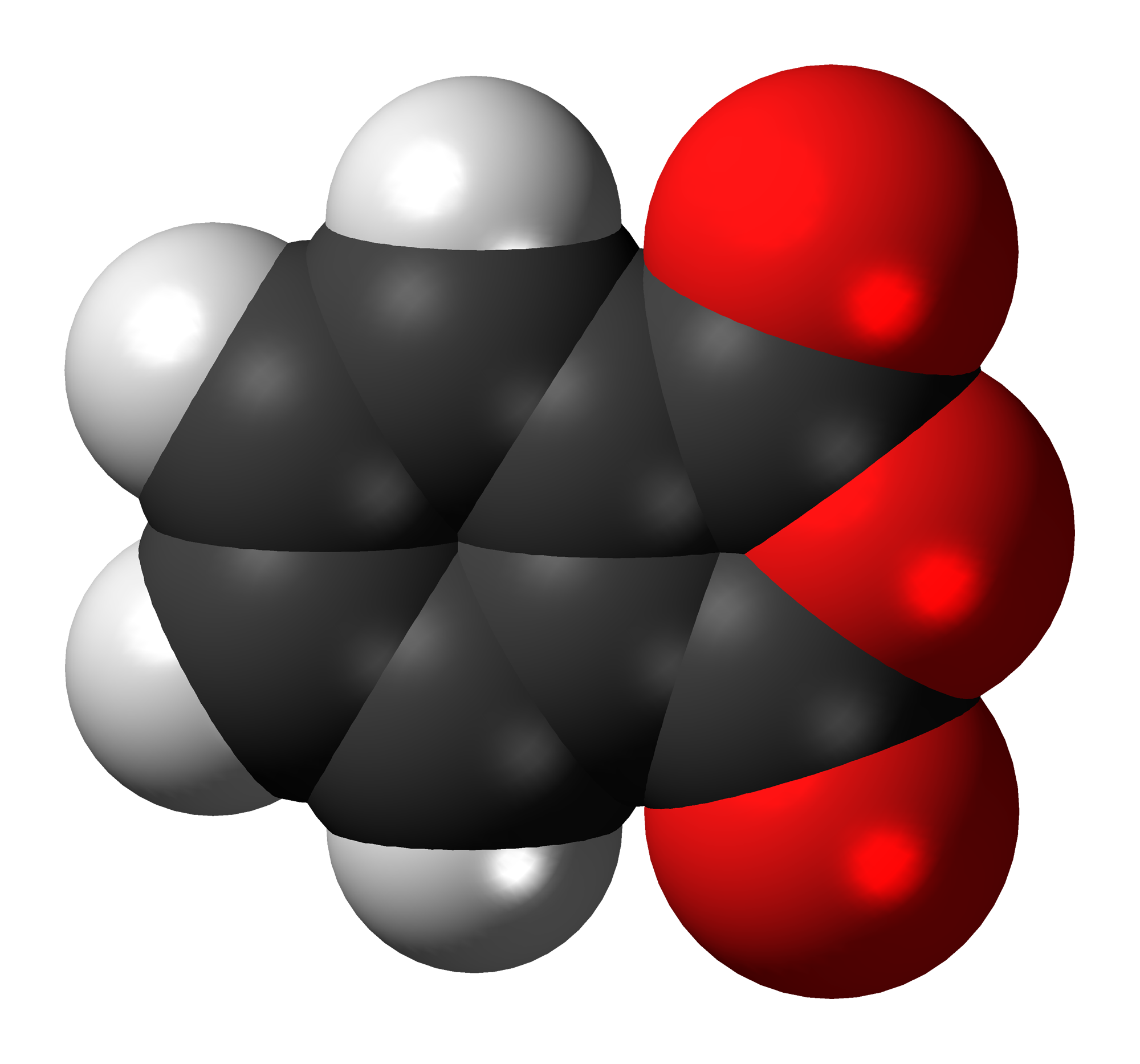
Space-filing model
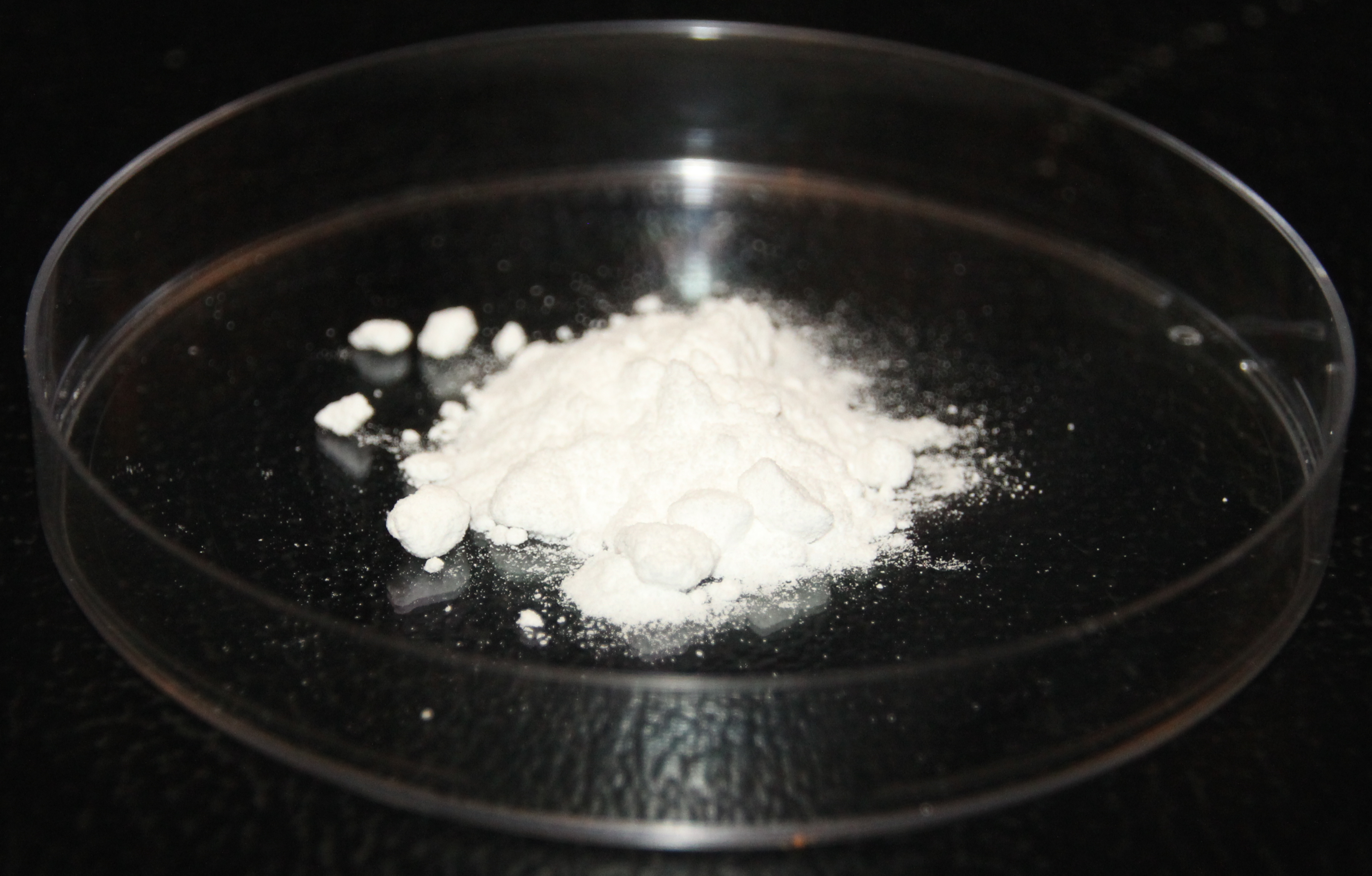

Names
- Preferred IUPAC name 2-Benzofuran-1,3-dione
- Other names Isobenzofuran-1,3-dione; Phthalic anhydride

Identifiers
CAS Number	85-44-9
3D model (JSmol)	Interactive image
Beilstein Reference	118515
ChEBI	CHEBI:36605
ChEMBL	ChEMBL1371297
ChemSpider	6552
ECHA InfoCard	100.001.461
EC Number	201-607-5
Gmelin Reference	27200
PubChem CID	6811
RTECS number	TI3150000
UNII	UVL263I5BJ
UN number	2214
CompTox Dashboard (EPA)	DTXSID2021159
- InChI: InChI=1S/C8H4O3/c9-7-5-3-1-2-4-6(5)8(10)11-7/h1-4H Key: LGRFSURHDFAFJT-UHFFFAOYSA-N
- SMILES: O=C1OC(=O)c2ccccc21

Properties
Chemical formula	C_{8}H_{4}O_{3}
Molar mass	148.1 g/mol
Appearance	white flakes
Odor	characteristic, acrid
Density	1.53 g/cm^{3}, solid; 1.20 g/mL, molten
Melting point	131.6 °C (268.9 °F; 404.8 K)
Boiling point	295 °C (563 °F; 568 K) sublimates
Solubility in water	0.62 g/100g (20—25 °C); 19.0 g/100g (100 °C); reacts slowly
Vapor pressure	0.0015 mmHg (20 °C)
Magnetic susceptibility (χ)	−67.31×10^{−6} cm^{3}/mol

Hazards
- GHS labelling
Pictograms	(GHS05: Corrosive) (GHS07: Exclamation mark) (GHS08: Health hazard)
Signal word	Danger
Hazard statements	H302, H315, H317, H318, H334, H335
Precautionary statements	P261, P264, P270, P271, P272, P280, P285, P301+P312, P302+P352, P304+P340, P304+P341, P305+P351+P338, P310, P312, P321, P330, P332+P313, P333+P313, P342+P311, P362, P363, P403+P233, P405, P501
NFPA 704 (fire diamond)	3 1 0
Flash point	152 °C (306 °F; 425 K)
Explosive limits	1.7%–10.5%
- Lethal dose or concentration (LD, LC)
LD_{50} (median dose)	4020 mg/kg (oral, rat); 1520 mg/kg (oral, mouse); 800 mg/kg (oral, cat); 800–1600 mg/kg (oral, rat); 2210 mg/kg (oral, mouse)
- NIOSH (US health exposure limits)
PEL (Permissible)	TWA 12 mg/m^{3} (2 ppm)
REL (Recommended)	TWA 6 mg/m^{3} (1 ppm)
IDLH (Immediate danger)	60 mg/m^{3}

Related compounds
Related compounds	Phthalic acid; Phthalimide; Phthalide
- Except where otherwise noted, data are given for materials in their standard state (at 25 °C [77 °F], 100 kPa). verify (what is ?) Infobox references

Phthalic anhydride is the organic compound with the formula C_{6}H_{4}(CO)_{2}O. It is the anhydride of phthalic acid. Phthalic anhydride is a principal commercial form of phthalic acid. It was the first anhydride of a dicarboxylic acid to be used commercially. This white solid is an important industrial chemical, especially for the large-scale production of plasticizers for plastics. In 2000, the worldwide production volume was estimated to be about 3 million tonnes per year.

== Synthesis and production ==
Phthalic anhydride was first reported in 1836 by Auguste Laurent. Early procedures involved liquid-phase mercury-catalyzed oxidation of naphthalene.

The modern Gibbs phthalic anhydride process (the Gibbs–Wohl naphthalene oxidation) uses vanadium pentoxide (V_{2}O_{5}) to catalyze gas-phase reaction between naphthalene and molecular oxygen. The reaction involves oxidative cleavage of a ring and loss of two carbon atoms as carbon dioxide:

Proposed early steps in vanadium-catalyzed oxidation of naphthalene to phthalic anhydride, with V_{2}O_{5} represented as a molecule versus its true extended structure. An alternative mechanistic proposal is similar, but proceeds through a naphthoquinone intermediate.

ortho-Xylene oxidation, a more atom-economical process, has slowly displaced the naphthalene route, in part because ortho-xylene is more easily transported than napthalene. Run at about 320–400 °C, the reaction has the following stoichiometry:

C_{6}H_{4}(CH_{3})_{2} + 3 O_{2} → C_{6}H_{4}(CO)_{2}O + 3 H_{2}O

Ideally only benzylic hydrogens oxidize, but the reaction proceeds with only about 70% selectivity. About 10% goes to maleic anhydride instead:

C_{6}H_{4}(CH_{3})_{2} + 7 1/2 O_{2} → C_{4}H_{2}O_{3} + 4 H_{2}O + 4 CO_{2}

Distillation in a series of switch condensers recovers both products.

Phthalic anhydride can also be prepared from phthalic acid by simple thermal dehydration above 210 °C.

== Uses ==
=== Phthalate esters plasticizers ===
The primary use of phthalic anhydride is a precursor to phthalate esters, used as plasticizers in vinyl chloride. Phthalate esters are derived from phthalic anhydride by the alcoholysis reaction. In the 1980s, approximately 6.5 million tonnes of these esters were produced annually, and the scale of production was increasing each year, all from phthalic anhydride. The process begins with the reaction of phthalic anhydride with alcohols, giving the monoesters:

C_{6}H_{4}(CO)_{2}O + ROH → C_{6}H_{4}(CO_{2}H)CO_{2}R

The second esterification is more difficult and requires removal of water:

C_{6}H_{4}(CO_{2}H)CO_{2}R + ROH ⇌ C_{6}H_{4}(CO_{2}R)_{2} + H_{2}O

The most important diester is bis(2-ethylhexyl) phthalate ("DEHP"), used in the manufacture of polyvinyl chloride compounds.

=== Precursor to dyestuffs ===
Quinoline Yellow SS is a popular dye derived from the condensation of phthalic anhydride and 2-methylquinoline.

Phthalic anhydride is widely used in industry for the production of certain dyes. A well-known application of this reactivity is the preparation of the anthraquinone dye quinizarin by reaction with para-chlorophenol followed by hydrolysis of the chloride. Phenolphthalein can be synthesized by the condensation of phthalic anhydride with two equivalents of phenol under acidic conditions (hence the name). It was discovered in 1871 by Adolf von Baeyer.

Synthesis of phenolphthalein

=== Pharmaceuticals ===
Phthalic anhydride treated with cellulose acetate gives cellulose acetate phthalate (CAP), a common enteric coating excipient that has also been shown to have antiviral activity. Phthalic anhydride is a degradation product of CAP.

== Reactions ==
Phthalic anhydride is a versatile intermediate in organic chemistry, in part because it is bifunctional and cheaply available.

=== Hydrolysis, alcoholysis, ammonolysis ===
Hydrolysis by hot water forms ortho-phthalic acid:

C_{6}H_{4}(CO)_{2}O + H_{2}O → C_{6}H_{4}(CO_{2}H)_{2}

Hydrolysis of anhydrides is not typically a reversible process. Phthalic acid is however easily dehydrated to form phthalic anhydride. Above 180 °C, phthalic anhydride re-forms. Phthalic anhydride is used as a dehydration reagent.

Chiral alcohols form half-esters (see above), and these derivatives are often resolvable because they form diastereomeric salts with chiral amines such as brucine. A related ring-opening reaction involves peroxides to give the useful peroxy acid:

C_{6}H_{4}(CO)_{2}O + H_{2}O_{2} → C_{6}H_{4}(CO_{3}H)CO_{2}H

Phthalimide can be prepared by heating phthalic anhydride with aqueous ammonia giving a 95–97% yield. Alternatively, it may be prepared by treating the anhydride with ammonium carbonate or urea. It can also be produced by ammoxidation of o-xylene. Potassium phthalimide is commercially available and is the potassium salt of phthalimide. It may be prepared by adding a hot solution of phthalimide to a solution of potassium hydroxide; the desired product precipitates.

Phthalic anhydride and phosphorus pentachloride react to give phthaloyl chloride:

C_{6}H_{4}C_{2}O_{3} + PCl_{5} → C_{6}H_{4}(COCl)_{2} + POCl_{3}

== Safety ==
The most probable human exposure to phthalic anhydride is through skin contact or inhalation during manufacture or use. Studies show that exposure to phthalic anhydride can cause rhinitis, chronic bronchitis, and asthma. Phthalic anhydride's reaction on human health is generally an asthma–rhinitis–conjunctivitis syndrome or a delayed reaction and influenza-like symptoms and with increased immunoglobulin (E and G) levels in the blood.
