= Maleamic acid =

Identifiers
CAS Number	557-24-4
3D model (JSmol)	Interactive image
ChEBI	CHEBI:29045
ChemSpider	4444106
ECHA InfoCard	100.008.332
EC Number	209-163-4
KEGG	C01596
PubChem CID	5280451
UNII	MJS1DTX3X1
CompTox Dashboard (EPA)	DTXSID301031738
- InChI: InChI=1S/C4H5NO3/c5-3(6)1-2-4(7)8/h1-2H,(H2,5,6)(H,7,8)/b2-1- Key: FSQQTNAZHBEJLS-UPHRSURJSA-N
- SMILES: C(=C\C(=O)O)\C(=O)N

Properties
Chemical formula	C_{4}H_{5}NO_{3}
Molar mass	115.088 g·mol^{−1}
Appearance	white solid
Melting point	158–161 °C (316–322 °F; 431–434 K)

Hazards
- GHS labelling
Pictograms	(GHS07: Exclamation mark)
Signal word	Warning
Hazard statements	H315, H319, H335
Precautionary statements	P261, P264, P264+P265, P271, P280, P302+P352, P304+P340, P305+P351+P338, P319, P321, P332+P317, P337+P317, P362+P364, P403+P233, P405, P501
- Except where otherwise noted, data are given for materials in their standard state (at 25 °C [77 °F], 100 kPa). Infobox references

Maleamic acid is an organic compound with the formula HO_{2}CCH=CHC(O)NH_{2}. It is the amide formed by reaction of maleic anhydride with ammonia. It is a colorless solid. Maleamic acid is the product of the action of the enzyme maleimide hydrolase.

== Related compounds ==
A variety of maleamic acids are known. Commonly they are prepared by the reaction of an amine with maleic anhydride.

Aside from maleic anhydride, other common cyclic anhydrides (and imides) undergo ring-opening to give amido carboxylic acids. Succinic anhydride gives succinamic acid (HO_{2}CCH_{2}CH_{2}C(O)NH_{2}), citraconic anhydride gives two isomers of citraconamic acid (HO_{2}CCH_{2}CH(CH_{3})C(O)NH_{2} and HO_{2}CCH(CH_{3})CH_{2}C(O)NH_{2}), and phthalimide gives phthalamidic acid (HO_{2}CC_{6}H_{4}C(O)NH_{2}).
