= Potassium phthalimide =

Identifiers
CAS Number	1074-82-4
3D model (JSmol)	Interactive image
ChemSpider	10627162
ECHA InfoCard	100.012.770
PubChem CID	3356745
UNII	X6KKA27DIL
CompTox Dashboard (EPA)	DTXSID5027358
- InChI: InChI=1S/C8H5NO2.K/c10-7-5-3-1-2-4-6(5)8(11)9-7;/h1-4H,(H,9,10,11);/q;+1 Key: FYRHIOVKTDQVFC-UHFFFAOYSA-N; InChI=1S/C8H5NO2.K/c10-7-5-3-1-2-4-6(5)8(11)9-7;/h1-4H,(H,9,10,11);/q;+1 Key: FYRHIOVKTDQVFC-UHFFFAOYAD; Key: FYRHIOVKTDQVFC-UHFFFAOYSA-N; InChI=1S/C8H5NO2.K/c10-7-5-3-1-2-4-6(5)8(11)9-7;/h1-4H,(H,9,10,11);/q;+1/p-1
- SMILES: C1=CC=C2C(=C1)C(=O)[N-]C2=O.[K+]

Properties
Chemical formula	C_{8}H_{4}KNO_{2}
Molar mass	185.221 g/mol
Appearance	Light yellow solid
Melting point	> 300 °C (572 °F; 573 K)
Solubility in water	Soluble in water

Hazards
NFPA 704 (fire diamond)	2 1 0

Related compounds
Related compounds	Phthalimide
- Except where otherwise noted, data are given for materials in their standard state (at 25 °C [77 °F], 100 kPa). verify (what is ?) Infobox references

Potassium phthalimide is an organic compound with the formula C_{6}H_{4}(CO)_{2}NK. It is the potassium salt of phthalimide, and usually presents as fluffy, very pale yellow crystals. It can be prepared by combining phthalimide and potassium hydroxide.:

This compound is a commercially available reagent used in the Gabriel synthesis of amines. It is a precursor to anthranilic acid, although sodium phthalimide is a more typical precursor.

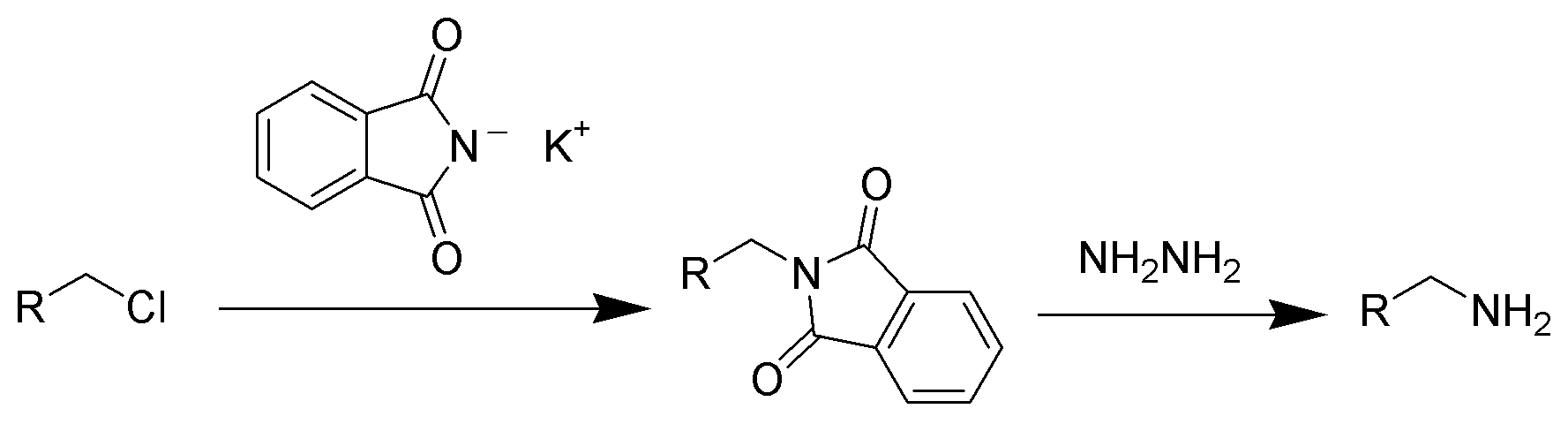

== Structure ==
The structure of solid potassium phthalimide has been determined by X-ray crystallography. It is a salt, the K+ centers being bound to oxygen and nitrogen ligands.
