= C28H46O4 =

The molecular formula C_{28}H_{46}O_{4} (molar mass: 446.66 g/mol, exact mass: 446.3396 u) may refer to:

- Diisodecyl phthalate (DIDP)
- DPHP, or di(2-propylheptyl) phthalate
