= Kirtiraj Gaikwad =

Indian packaging scientist

Kirtiraj K. Gaikwad is an Indian packaging scientist and professor, currently serving as the head and associate professor of the Paper and Packaging Technology Department at the Indian Institute of Technology Roorkee in Roorkee, Uttarakhand, India.

Gaikwad obtained his M.S. in Packaging Technology from Michigan State University, East Lansing, United States (2013), and his Ph.D. in Packaging Technology from Yonsei University, Seoul, South Korea (2018). He also served for several years as a postdoctoral scientist at École Polytechnique Montreal, Canada, in 2018.

Among his research topics are ⁣⁣active⁣⁣ and ⁣⁣intelligent⁣⁣ ⁣⁣packaging⁣⁣, ⁣⁣sustainable⁣⁣ ⁣⁣packaging materials⁣⁣, ⁣⁣biopolymer⁣⁣ films, and ⁣⁣food safety⁣⁣⁣ in ⁣⁣packaging⁣⁣. He has authored more than one hundred articles.

== Innovations and research ==
Professor Kirtiraj K. Gaikwad has led and contributed to several applied research projects in sustainable materials and food-packaging technologies at the Indian Institute of Technology Roorkee.

- Eco-packaging with ethylene scavenger (2025): Gaikwad and his research team developed an eco-friendly packaging system that incorporates a modified clay-based ethylene scavenger to slow ripening and extend the shelf life of fresh produce. Laboratory tests reported high ethylene adsorption efficiency and the approach was offered for licensing as a scalable, non-toxic alternative to conventional synthetic scavengers.
- Plant-based biodegradable plastic: His group developed a plant-based biodegradable polymer for packaging applications that was reported to degrade within about a week under certain conditions, offering a potential route to reduce persistent plastic waste from disposable packaging.
- Edible millet products (straws and cups): Under Gaikwad’s supervision, researchers produced nutritious, edible straws made from millet as a sustainable alternative to single-use plastic straws. The team also developed Kodo-millet-based edible cups, demonstrating the potential for locally sourced millets to serve as feedstock for edible and biodegradable disposable tableware.
- Alternative paper from waste biomass: Gaikwad contributed to work converting pine-needle waste into paper suitable for food-related applications, offering a value-added use for forest residues and a low-cost feedstock for sustainable paper products.
- Edible ink and food-safe printing materials: His group developed edible inks and explored alternative papers and printing approaches aimed at improving food safety for printed food labels and safe on-food printing applications.

== Awards and honors ==
- Prof. Gaikwad was awarded the "APA YOUNG SCIENTIST AWARD 2025" by the Asian Polymer Association (APA) India for outstanding contributions in biopolymer research.
- Prof. Gaikwad was appointed as an "Editorial Board Member" for the Food Bioscience journal by Elsevier (Impact Factor 5.6).
- Prof. Gaikwad was appointed as Associate Editor for the Journal of Food Measurement and Characterization, published by Springer Nature (Impact Factor 3.5).
- Prof. Gaikwad was appointed as an "Editorial Board Member" for the Packaging Science and Technology journal by Wiley, USA (Impact Factor 3.7).

== Selected publications ==
- Kumar, Lokesh; Ramakanth, Dakuri; Akhila, Konala; Gaikwad, Kirtiraj K. (2022). "Edible films and coatings for food packaging applications: a review". Environmental Chemistry Letters. 20 (1): 875–900. Bibcode:2022EnvCL..20..875K. doi:10.1007/s10311-021-01339-z. ISSN 1610-3653.
- Gaikwad, Kirtiraj K.; Singh, Suman; Lee, Youn Suk (2018). "Oxygen scavenging films in food packaging". Environmental Chemistry Letters. 16 (2): 523–538. Bibcode:2018EnvCL..16..523G. doi:10.1007/s10311-018-0705-z. ISSN 1610-3653.
- Gaikwad, Kirtiraj K.; Singh, Suman; Ajji, Abdellah (2019). "Moisture absorbers for food packaging applications". Environmental Chemistry Letters. 17 (2): 609–628. Bibcode:2019EnvCL..17..609G. doi:10.1007/s10311-018-0810-z. ISSN 1610-3653.
- Gaikwad, Kirtiraj K.; Singh, Suman; Negi, Yuvraj Singh (2020). "Ethylene scavengers for active packaging of fresh food produce". Environmental Chemistry Letters. 18 (2): 269–284. Bibcode:2020EnvCL..18..269G. doi:10.1007/s10311-019-00938-1. ISSN 1610-3653.
- Gaikwad, Kirtiraj K.; Lee, Jin Yong; Lee, Youn Suk (2016). "Development of polyvinyl alcohol and apple pomace bio-composite film with antioxidant properties for active food packaging application". Journal of Food Science and Technology. 53 (3): 1608–1619. doi:10.1007/s13197-015-2104-9. ISSN 0022-1155. PMC 4984712. PMID 27570286.
- Rout, Srutee; Tambe, Srushti; Deshmukh, Ram Kumar; Mali, Suraj; Cruz, Jorddy; Srivastav, Prem Prakash; Amin, Purnima D.; Gaikwad, Kirtiraj K.; Andrade, Eloisa Helena de Aguiar; Oliveira, Mozaniel Santana de (2022). "Recent trends in the application of essential oils: The next generation of food preservation and food packaging". Trends in Food Science & Technology. 129: 421–439. doi:10.1016/j.tifs.2022.10.012.
- Singh, Suman; Gaikwad, Kirtiraj K.; Park, Su-Il; Lee, Youn Suk (2017). "Microwave-assisted step reduced extraction of seaweed ( Gelidiella aceroso ) cellulose nanocrystals". International Journal of Biological Macromolecules. 99: 506–510. doi:10.1016/j.ijbiomac.2017.03.004. PMID 28267615.
- Tanwar, Rohit; Gupta, Vidhi; Kumar, Pardeep; Kumar, Anil; Singh, Suman; Gaikwad, Kirtiraj K. (2021). "Development and characterization of PVA-starch incorporated with coconut shell extract and sepiolite clay as an antioxidant film for active food packaging applications". International Journal of Biological Macromolecules. 185: 451–461. doi:10.1016/j.ijbiomac.2021.06.179. PMID 34216655.
- Singh, Suman; Gaikwad, Kirtiraj K.; Lee, Youn Suk (2018). "Phase change materials for advanced cooling packaging". Environmental Chemistry Letters. 16 (3): 845–859. Bibcode:2018EnvCL..16..845S. doi:10.1007/s10311-018-0726-7. ISSN 1610-3653.

== Patents ==
- Patent number KR101935245B1 was granted to You Suk Lee and Kirtiraj K. Gaikwad for their oxygen scavenging film and composition for packaging that contains the same ingredients.
- Patent number KR101911284B1 was granted to You Suk Lee and Kirtiraj K. Gaikwad for UV activated oxygen absorbing packaging materials and preparation method thereof. The patent was granted in South Korea.
- Patent Number: 376109-001, India, granted to Kirtiraj K. Gaikwad and Pragya Srivastava for their design of a rigid bottle for use in packaging applications.
