= Edible packaging =

Food containers which can be eaten

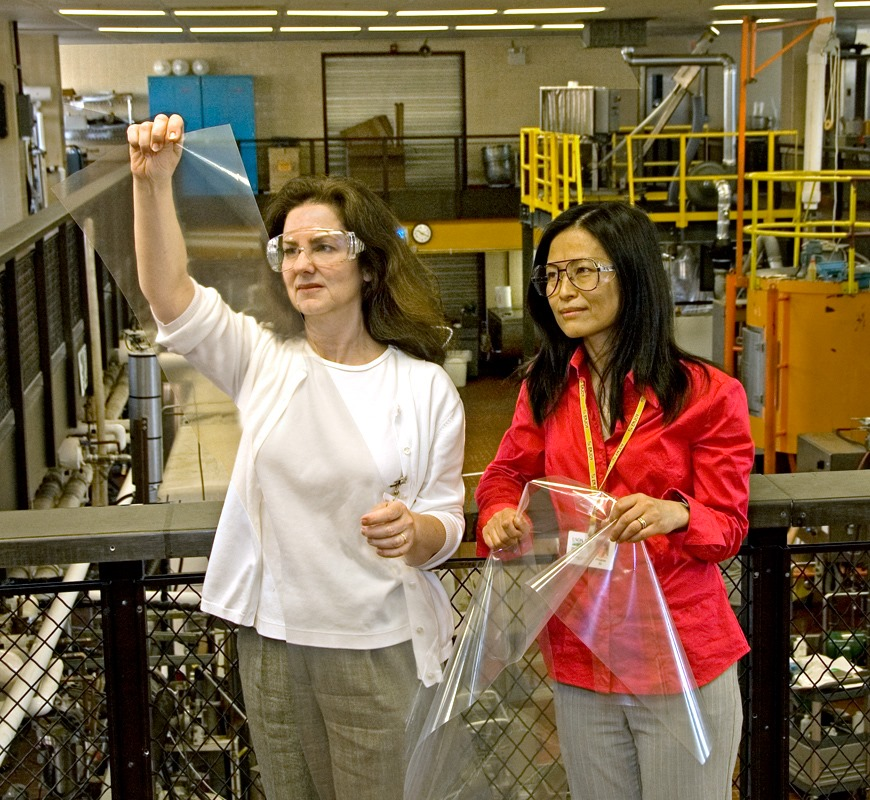
Development of an edible casein film overwrap

Edible packaging refers to packaging which is edible and biodegradable.

== Edible food packaging ==
Several manufacturers are developing or producing food packaging that is edible. One example is made based on the seaweed, Eucheuma cottonii.

== Traditional water containers ==
About 50 billion single-use plastic water bottles made of polyethylene terephthalate (PET) are produced in the United States each year, and most are discarded. According to the National Association for PET Container Resources, the recycling rate for PET has held steady at 31% since 2013.

Polyesters like PET can be broken down through hydrolytic degradation: the ester linkage is cut by a water molecule. The reaction proceeds differently in acidic or alkaline conditions, but works best at temperatures between 200 and 300 °C. Under environmental conditions the process is undetectably slow.

PET is considered to be essentially non-biodegradable, with plastic bottles estimated to take as long as 450 years to decompose. Because of this, other packaging materials are being sought.

=== Calcium alginate gel ===
Sodium alginate (NaAlg)

Alginates are the natural product of brown algae and have been used extensively in wound dressing, drug delivery and tissue engineering, as well as food applications. Sodium alginate is an unbranched copolymer of 1,4-linked-β-d-mannuronate (M) and α-l-guluronate (G) sugars.

Sodium alginate (NaAlg) coagulates when exposed to calcium chloride (CaCl_{2}) and forms calcium alginate (CaAlg_{2}) and sodium chloride (NaCl), according to the following reaction:

2NaAlg + CaCl_{2} → CaAlg_{2} + 2NaCl

=== Safety and biodegradability ===
The biocompatibility of alginate gels has been studied extensively and their safety for consumption is well established. As natural polysaccharides resistant to breakdown by human digestive enzymes, alginates are classified as dietary fiber. Although undigested if eaten, an alginate capsule will gradually decompose as the calcium diffuses out of the gel matrix in the reverse of the reaction above.

CaAlg_{2} + 2NaCl → 2NaAlg + CaCl_{2}

Because it is a single-strand polymer, alginate can be depolymerized (broken into smaller units) by a variety of chemical reactions. Both acid and alkaline mechanisms can break down the linkages between the mannuronate (M) and guluronate (G) monomers. Free radical oxidation is another way the alginate can be degraded in the environment. Many bacterial species produce an enzyme (alginate lyase) which can break the molecule down into single sugar components, which can act as an energy source for the organism.

== Kodo millet-based edible packaging ==
In 2025, a report made by researchers Kirtiraj Gaikwad and Bhushan P. Meshram in the Indian Institute of Technology Roorkee (IIT Roorkee) claimed to have invented kodo millet (Paspalum scrobiculatum)-based edible cups, in an effort to create an alternative solution to plastic cups and to reduce plastic waste. It uses kodo millet, guar gum, and dried hibiscus flower powder, along with minimal use of powdered sugar. Aiming to create a more biodegradable option, the cups use underutilized crops.

An effort is made by researchers to utilize renewable resources and reduce fossil-fuel-based plastics, in order to minimize plastic pollution and offer a more sustainable alternative for packaging industries globally.

== See also ==
- Biodegradation
- Calcium alginate
- Low plastic water bottle
- Molecular gastronomy
- Spherification
- Water bottle
- Starch-based foam peanuts
- WikiCell
