= Petcore =

Belgian recycling trade association

PET Container Recycling Europe, commonly known as Petcore, is a Brussels-based non-profit European trade association.

== History ==
Petcore was founded in 1993 to promote the collection, sorting and recycling of post-consumer PET bottles. It networks with national collection agencies, governments, and the recycling industry. PET bottle recycling has significantly increased in the period 1991–2011, and continues to do so.

Used PET bottles are light-weight but once collected, sorted and pressed into bales, they become a valuable raw material for a range of products. End markets for recycled PET include polyester fibre, sheet, strapping, and new bottles.

== PET collection ==
Out of 3,147,000 tonnes of PET bottles and containers placed in the European market in 2016, 59.8% (1,880,900 tonnes) were collected of which 1,773,200 tonnes were mechanically recycled. However, voluntary commitments and increased adoption of deposit return systems are unlikely to be sufficient to achieve a 100% recycling rate.

== See also ==
- PET bottle recycling
- Container-deposit legislation
