= Water bottle =

Container for liquids

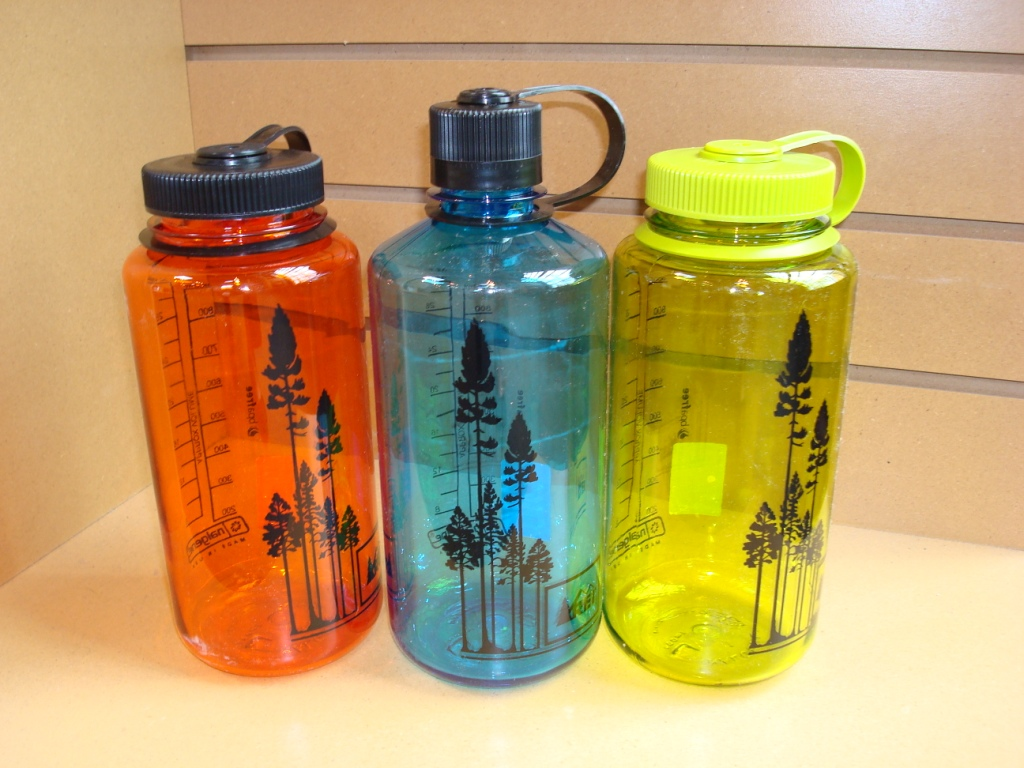
Multi-use HDPE water bottles

A water bottle is a container, typically a plastic one, that is used to hold water for drinking.

Water bottles are usually plastic, glass, cartons or cans. Historically, water bottles were also made of glass and ceramic.

Water bottles can be either disposable or reusable. Disposable water bottles are often sold filled with potable water, the water being the product rather than the container, while reusable bottles are designed to be refilled and reused multiple times. Reusable water bottles help cut down on consumer plastic waste and carbon emissions. A reusable water bottle designed for outdoor activities is also called a canteen.

== Types ==
=== Single-use plastic ===
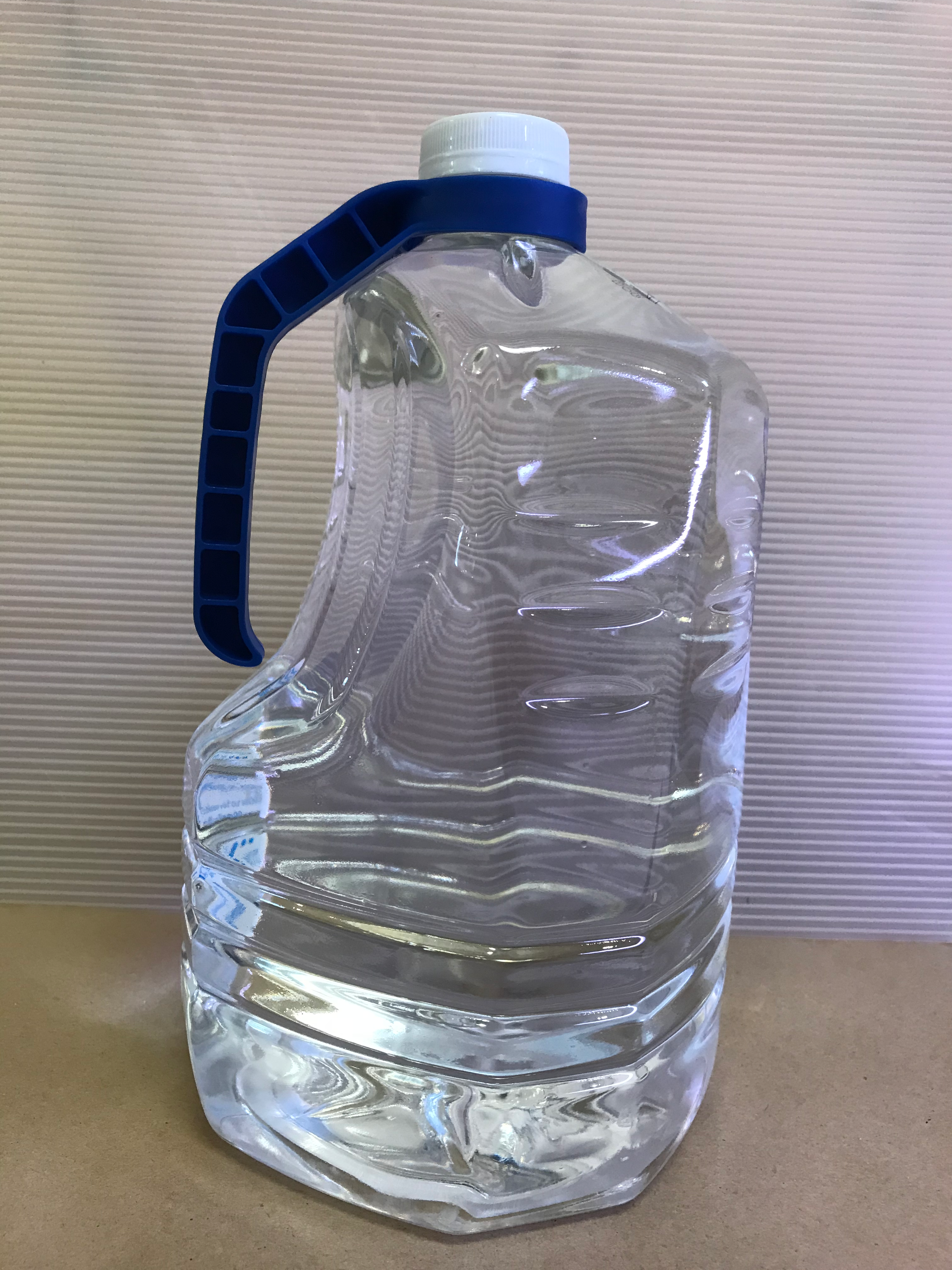
A one-gallon PETE water bottle with attached package handle

Sales of single-use, pre-filled plastic water bottles have increased almost every year for more than a decade. In 2011, greater than US$11 billion was spent on bottled water products in the United States alone. The International Bottled Water Association (IBWA) states that people are increasingly relying on water bottles for convenience and portability.

In some countries with low-quality tap water, citizens also use bottled water (including in family-size containers kept in the home) for health reasons. For example, as of 2010, Mexico had an average 8 percent increase per year in bottled water purchases and consumed approximately 13 percent of the world's total of bottled water. Mexican citizens drink more bottled water than people of any other country, at an average of 61.8 gallons per person each year – more than twice the rate of US per capita consumption. The increase in the use of single-use personal plastic water bottles has contributed markedly to the country's litter problem, though the increase in the popularity of bottled water has come with a decrease in the growth rate of consumption of soft drinks (which pose health risks in excessive quantities, as well as the same littering problem).

=== Reusable plastic ===
Multi-use water bottles can be made from high-density polyethylene (HDPE), low-density polyethylene (LDPE), copolyester, or polypropylene. They all offer the advantage of being durable, lightweight, dishwasher-safe, and BPA-free. The main difference between each type of water bottle is the flexibility of the material. Copolyester and polypropylene offer the greatest rigidity; HDPE retains some flexibility; LDPE (most commonly associated with collapsible, squeeze bottles) is highly flexible.

=== Metal ===
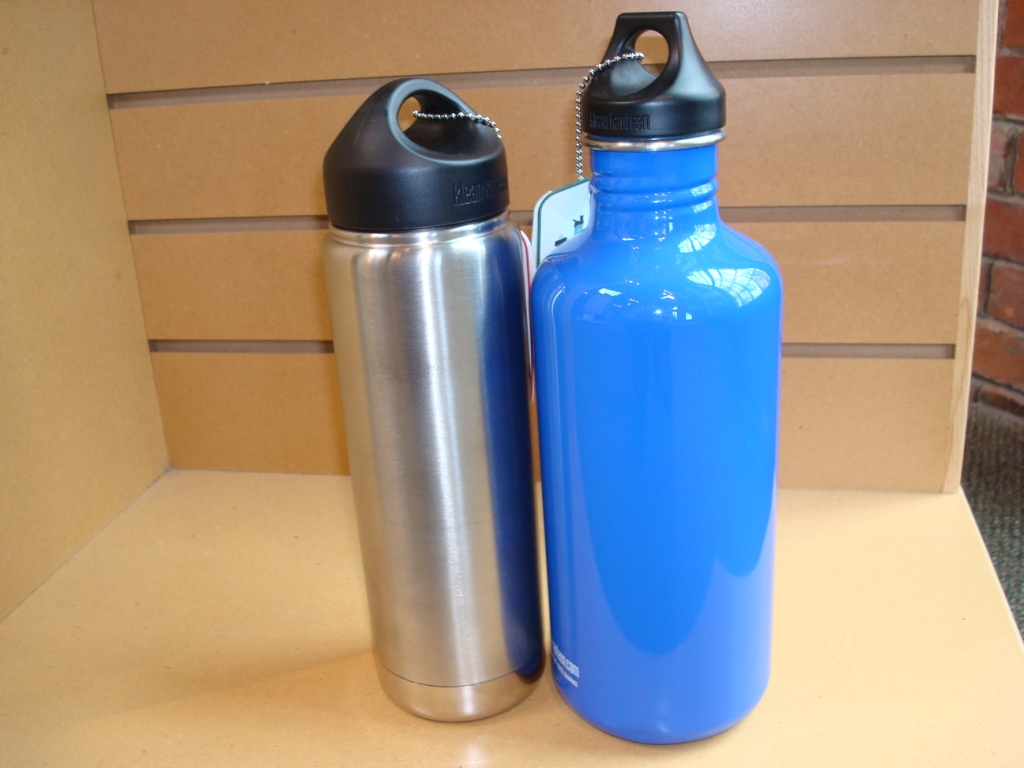
Metal water bottles

Metal water bottles are growing rapidly in popularity. Made primarily from stainless steel or aluminium (aluminum), they are durable and retain less odor and taste from previous contents than most plastic bottles. But these can sometimes impart a metallic taste. Metal bottles thus often contain a resin or epoxy liner to protect contents from taste and odor transfer or corrosion. Although most liners are now BPA-free, older and less expensive models can contain BPA. Glass liners may also be used.

It is not recommended to fill aluminium bottles with acidic liquids (e.g. orange juice), as this could cause aluminium to leach into the contents of the bottle. Depending on the type of source material and manufacturing process behind a stainless steel bottle, trace amounts of minerals can leach into contents from this type of bottle as well. Stainless steel bottles that do not contain a liner have been known to transfer a rusty taste and odor to contents. Bottles made with food-grade stainless steel (grade 304, also known as 18/8) do not transfer taste or odor.

Metal (especially steel) water bottles can be heavier than their plastic counterparts. Single-walled metal bottles readily transfer temperature of contents to external surfaces, which makes them unsuitable for use with unusually hot or cold liquids. Double-walled metal bottles are insulated to keep cold liquids cold and hot liquids hot, without the external surface being too hot or too cold. Because double-walled bottles have more metal in them, they are more expensive. They are typically vacuum-insulated, but some may have a solid or gel insulation between the metal walls.

=== Glass ===
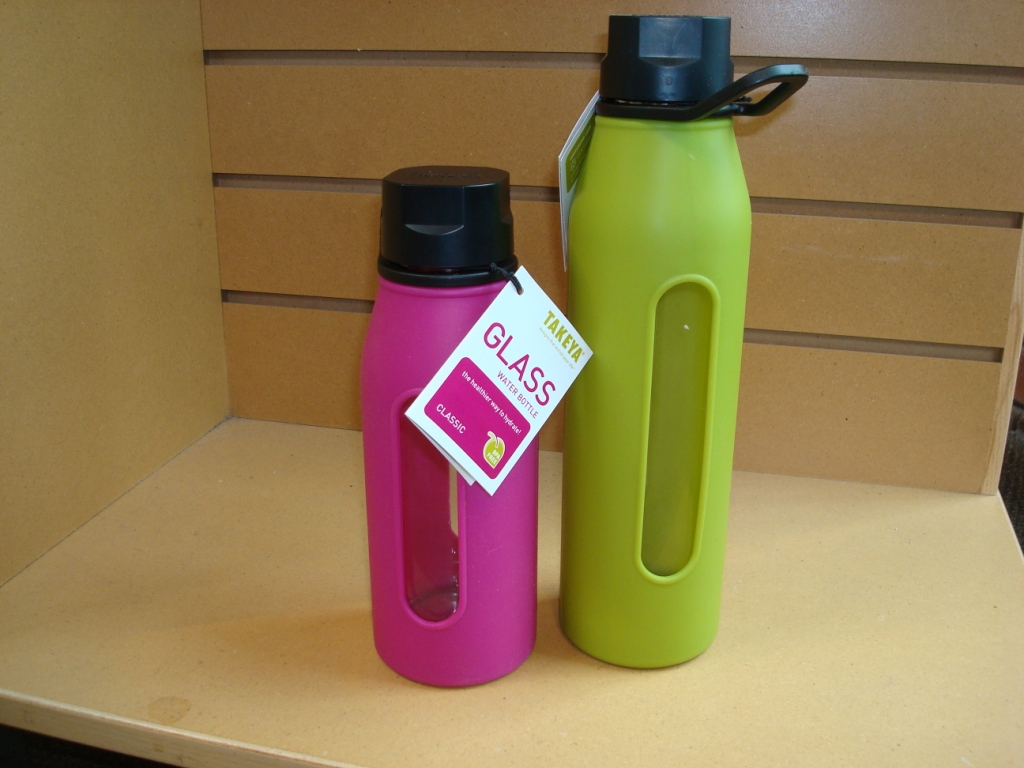
Glass water bottle with protective silicone sleeve

Glass flasks have been used since ancient times, though were not common until the Early Modern period when consistent, bulk manufacturing of glass products became easier. Because they are completely recyclable, BPA-free, and do not retain and transfer taste or odor, glass water bottles are becoming a popular choice for many consumers who are concerned about their health.

Glass bottles are heavier than plastic, stainless steel, or aluminium, and are easier to damage or completely break. Like metal, they also have a high level of temperature transfer, so they are not ideal for very hot or cold liquids. Some types of vacuum-insulated flasks use an inner layer of glass (which is easy to clean), and an outer layer of metal or plastic which helps shield the glass from breakage. Such bottles may still break if dropped, and thus some brands are triple-layer, with the glass inside two layers of plastic; this is a common configuration for large flasks intended for coffee or other liquids that need to be insulated.

=== Filtering ===
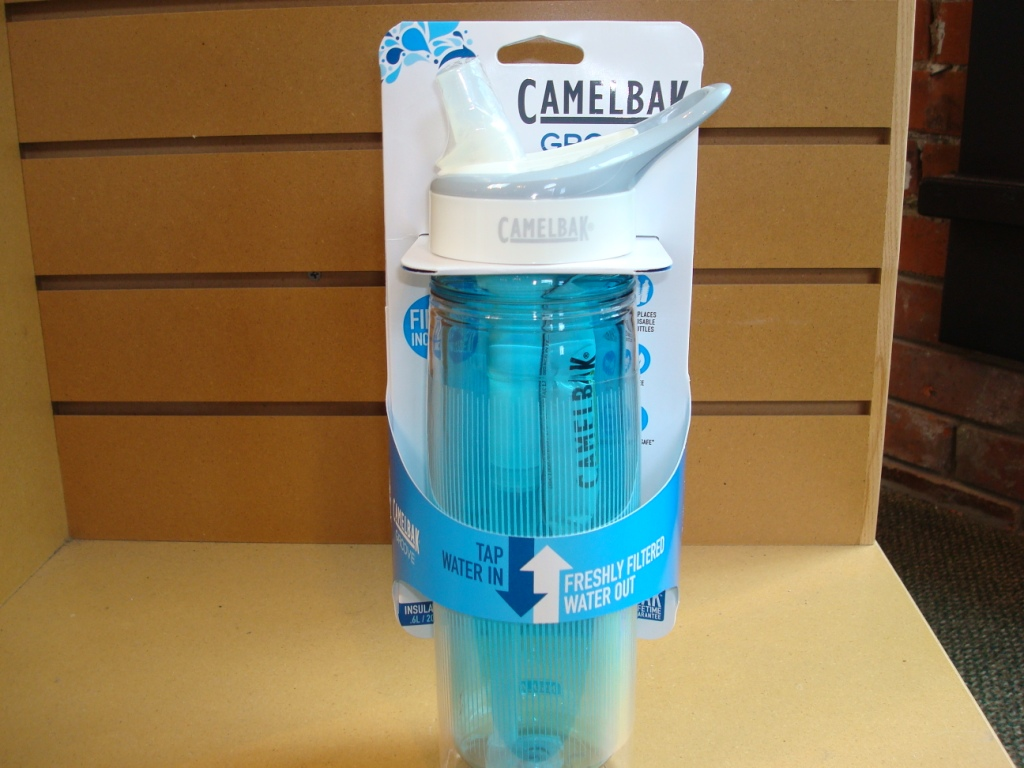
Carbon filtering water bottle

This type of bottle is often BPA-Free and more commonly uses carbon (activated charcoal) filtration. UV light can also be used to purify water. UV filtration bottles are popular and convenient for those who are travelling to areas where water quality may be harmful, or where bottled water is not readily available. UV is effective against all water-borne pathogens.

Carbon filtration bottles will eliminate some organic chemicals and improve the taste and odor of water. Carbon filtration will not eliminate pathogens, metals or nitrates from water.

=== Wirelessly connected ===
Connected devices collect data related to a person's water intake. The data is transmitted to a smartphone, which enables tracking of an individual's water intake and alerts the user when they are not properly hydrated. These devices are a result of technology advancements that fall in the broader category of the Internet of Things. Devices that monitor and collect data related to one's personal health are also part of the quantified self movement. While several concepts have been introduced, none are currently available commercially.

=== Hydration reservoirs ===
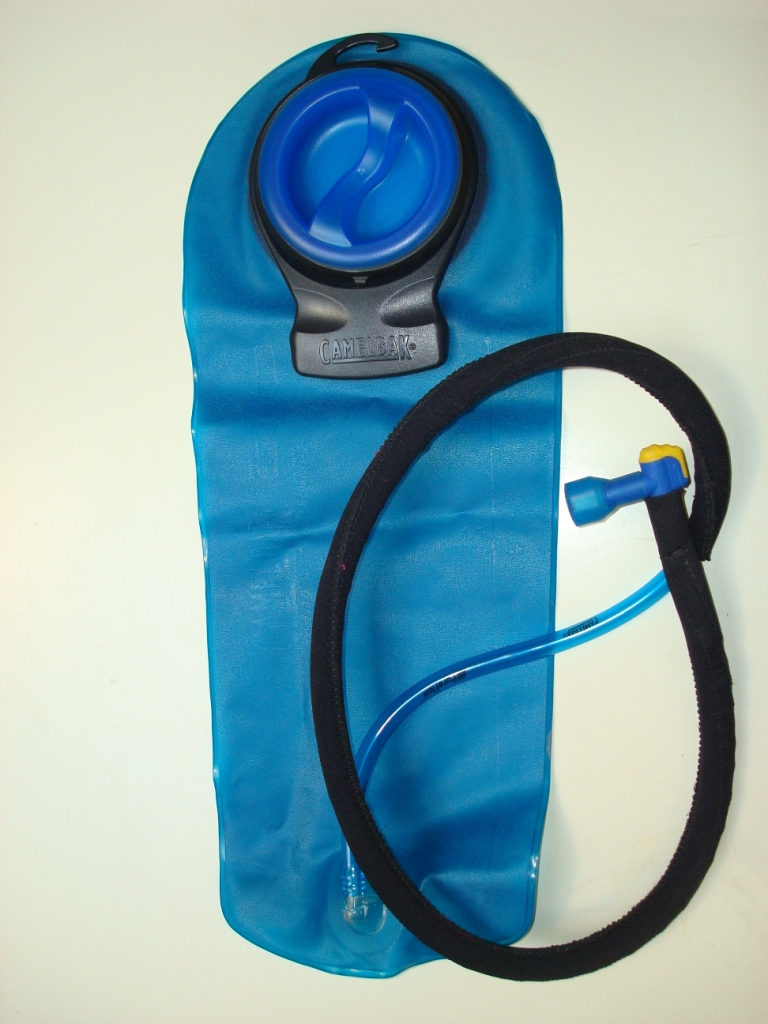
Hydration reservoir

Hydration reservoirs, also known as hydration bladders, are large-volume, flexible bags typically carried in a backpack system. Users access water via a sipping tube. This system allows the user to remain engaged in activity without having to stop and unscrew a water bottle. Such reservoirs also permit the carrying of a larger water supply (thus a longer hike), as they have both more capacity and better integration into the carrying equipment than an external water bottle or canteen attached to the pack or belt.

== Popularity ==
Due to growing concern over the environmental impact and cost of disposable plastic water bottles, more people are choosing to fill multi-use water bottles. However, the popularity and availability of disposable plastic water bottles continues to rise. In 2007, Americans consumed 50 billion single-serve bottles of water. Since 2001, the sale of single-serve bottled water has fluctuated by 70 percent, and this trend is continuing.

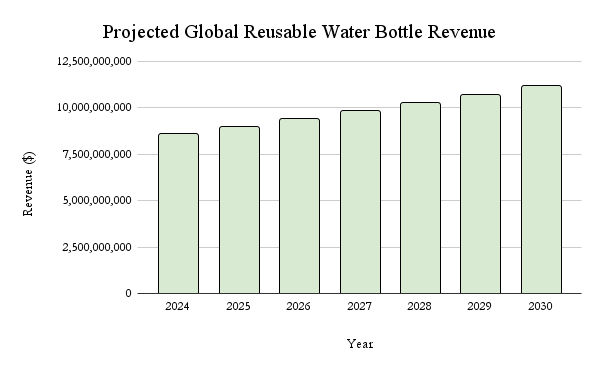
This graph shows the projected global revenue for reusable water bottles from 2024 to 2030

In 2016, a trend among Americans called "water bottle flipping" attracted media attention.

=== Health ===
Chemicals used for making some types of bottles have been shown to be detrimental to the health of humans. Inhalation of chemicals used in the manufacture of plastics is a hazard for the factory workers who handle the material. In many developing countries, plastic waste is burned rather than recycled or deposited in landfills. Rural residents of developing countries who burn plastic as a disposal method are not protected from the chemical inhalation hazards associated with this practice. It is important to dispose of water that has been stored in PET bottles that have been exposed to high temperatures for a prolonged period of time or are beyond the expiration date because harmful chemicals may leach from the plastic.

In 2008, researchers from Arizona State University found that storing plastic bottles in temperatures at or above 60 °C can cause antimony to enter the water contained in the bottles. Therefore, frequently drinking from bottles stored in places such as cars during the summer months may have negative health effects.

Bottle manufacturing relies on petroleum and natural resources. Some manufacturing processes release toxic chemicals into the air and water supply that can affect nervous systems, blood cells, kidneys, immune systems, and can cause cancer and birth defects. Most disposable water bottles are made from petroleum-derived polyethylene terephthalate (PET). While PET is considered less toxic than many other types of plastic, the Berkeley Ecology Center found that manufacturing PET creates toxic emissions in the form of nickel, ethylbenzene, ethylene oxide and benzene at levels 100 times higher than those created to make the same amount of glass.

=== Environment ===
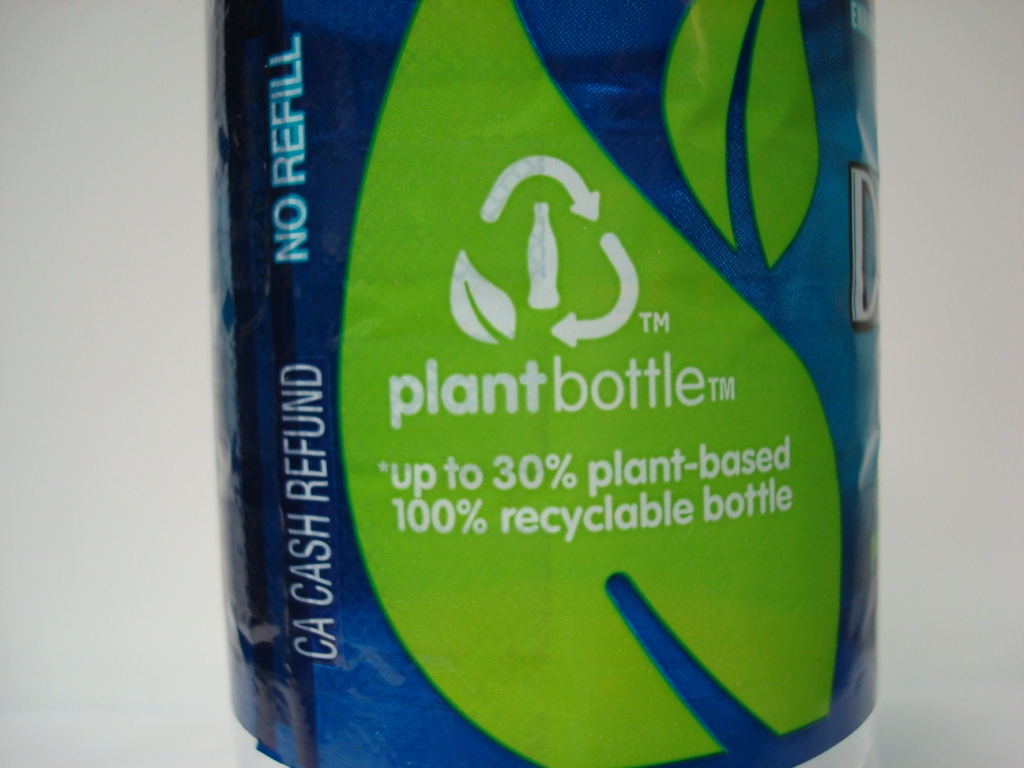
Label on disposable water bottle highlighting positive environmental attributes

Water bottles made of glass, aluminium and steel are the most readily recyclable. HDPE and LDPE bottles can be recycled as well.

Because the manufacturing and transportation of disposable water bottles requires petroleum, a non-renewable resource, the single-serve bottled water industry has come under pressure from concerned consumers. The Pacific Institute calculates that it required about 17 million barrels of oil to make the disposable plastic bottles for single-serve water that Americans consumed in 2006. To sustain the consumptive use of products relying on plastic components and level of manufactured demand for plastic water bottles, the result is shortages of fossil fuels. Furthermore, it means not only a shortage of the raw materials to make plastics, but also a shortage of the energy required to fuel their production.

Single-serve bottled water industry has responded to consumer concern about the environmental impact of disposable water bottles by significantly reducing the amount of plastic used in bottles. The reduced plastic content also results in a lower weight product that uses less energy to transport. Other bottle manufacturing companies are experimenting with alternative materials such as corn starch to make new bottles that are more readily biodegradable.

The lowest impact water bottles are those made of glass or metal. They are not made from petroleum and are easily recyclable. By choosing to continuously fill any multi-use water bottle, the consumer keeps disposable bottles out of the waste stream and reduces damage to the environment.

== See also ==
- Beverage can
- Bottled water
- Carboy
- Edible water bottle
- Low plastic water bottle
- Plastic pollution
- Sipper water bottle, a water dispenser for pets
- Refill (scheme)
