= Sustainable packaging =

Packaging that results in improved sustainability

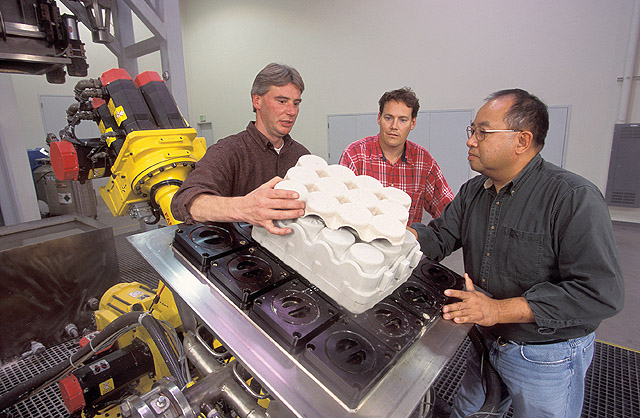
Molded pulp uses recycled newsprint to form package components. Here, researchers are molding packaging from straw

Sustainable packaging refers to the design, manufacture and use of packaging with the aim of reducing environmental impacts over its life cycle while maintaining its functional and economic requirements. This involves increased use of life cycle inventory (LCI) and life cycle assessment (LCA) to help guide the use of packaging which reduces the environmental impact and ecological footprint. It includes a look at the whole of the supply chain: from basic function, to marketing, and then through to end of life (LCA) and rebirth. Additionally, an eco-cost to value ratio can be useful The goals are to improve the long term viability and quality of life for humans and the longevity of natural ecosystems. Sustainable packaging must meet the functional and economic needs of the present without compromising the ability of future generations to meet their own needs. Sustainability is not necessarily an end state but is a continuing process of improvement. Life-cycle assessment can also be used to compare packaging systems and identify trade-offs between different materials, manufacturing processes and end-of-life scenarios.

Sustainable packaging is a relatively new addition to the environmental considerations for packaging (see Packaging and labeling). It requires more analysis and documentation to look at the package design, choice of materials, processing, and life-cycle. Companies implementing sustainable packaging measures are reducing their carbon footprint, using more recycled materials and reusing more package components. Extended producer responsibility indicates that packagers, product producers, and distributors have a full range of responsibility.

Environmental marketing claims on packages need to be made (and read) with caution. Broad environmental claims such as green packaging and environmentally friendly can be confusing without specific definition. Some regulators, such as the US Federal Trade Commission, are providing guidance to packagers

Companies have long been reusing and recycling packaging when economically viable. Using minimal packaging has also been a common goal to help reduce costs. Recent years have accelerated these efforts based on social movements, consumer pressure, and regulation. All phases of packaging, distribution, and logistics are included.

Sustainable packaging encompasses more than recycling, addressing a broader range of environmental impacts across the product life cycle, while packaging itself represents only one component of a product's overall environmental impact. Packaging is often treated as a visible indicator of a company's environmental performance, although its contribution to a product's overall environmental impact may be smaller than impacts associated with factors such as production, transportation, water use and energy consumption.

== Environmental impacts ==
The environmental impacts of packaging can occur throughout its life cycle, including raw-material extraction, material and package production, transportation, use, and end-of-life treatment such as reuse, recycling, composting, incineration or disposal. These stages can contribute to greenhouse gas emissions, air pollution, resource depletion, water and energy use, acidification and other environmental impacts. For food packaging, design can also affect product preservation and food waste by protecting against physical damage, contamination and spoilage. Assessments of food packaging may therefore consider both the environmental impacts of the package itself and its role in preventing product loss.

== Criteria ==
The criteria for ranking and comparing packaging based on their sustainability are an active area of development. General guidance, metrics, checklists, and scorecards are being published by several groups.

Government, standards organizations, consumers, retailers, and packagers are considering several types of criteria.

Each organization words the goals and targets a little differently. In general, the broad goals of sustainable packaging are:

1. Functional – product protection, safety, regulatory compliance, etc.
2. Cost effective – if it is too expensive, it is unlikely to be used
3. Support long-term human and ecological health

Specific factors for sustainable design of packaging may include:

- Use of minimal materials – reduced packaging, reduced layers of packaging, lower mass (product to packaging ratio), lower volume, etc.
- Energy efficiency, total energy content and usage, use of renewable energy, use of clean energy, etc.
- Recycled content – as available and functional. For food contact materials, there are special safety considerations, particularly for use of recycled plastics and paper. Regulations are published by each country or region.
- Recyclability – recovery value, use of materials which are frequently and easily recycled, reduction of materials which hinder recyclability of major components, etc.
- Reusable packaging – repeated reuse of package, reuse for other purposes, etc.
- Use of renewable, biodegradable and compostable materials – when appropriate and do not cause contamination of the recycling stream
- Paper-based tube packaging is one format that achieves this through mono-material construction, with certifications such as FSC, BPI, and EN 13432 supporting compostability and recyclability across multiple markets.
- Avoid the use of materials toxic to humans or the environment
- Effects on atmosphere/climate – ozone layer, greenhouse gases (carbon dioxide and methane), volatile organic compounds, etc.
- Water use, reuse, treatment, waste, etc.
- Worker impact: occupational health, safety, clean technology, etc.

The chosen criteria are often used best as a basis of comparison for two or more similar packaging designs; not as an absolute success or failure. Such a multi-variable comparison is often presented as a radar chart (spider chart, star chart, etc.).

== Benefits ==
Some aspects of environmentally sound packaging are required by regulators while others are decisions made by individual packagers. Investors, employees, management, and customers can influence corporate decisions and help set policies. When investors seek to purchase stock, companies known for their positive environmental policy can be attractive. Potential stockholders and investors see this as a solid decision: lower environmental risks lead to more capital at cheaper rates. Companies that highlight their environmental status to consumers can boost sales as well as product reputation. Going green is often a sound investment that can pay off.

Alongside the environmental benefits of adopting sustainable packaging, eco-friendly packaging can increase sales, reduce packaging cost, and increase the image of a company's brand alongside the rising awareness spread regarding environmental impact. There has also been found a direct correlation between a company's implementation of sustainable packaging and a more sustainable supply chain management. Alternatives such as bio-based plastics that are abundant, low cost, and biodegradable, offer a possibility of reducing use of petroleum resources and carbon dioxide emissions.

== Alternatives to conventional plastics ==
Bio-based materials have been developed or used for packaging without plastics, especially for use-cases in which packaging can't be phased-out, such as for food preservation.

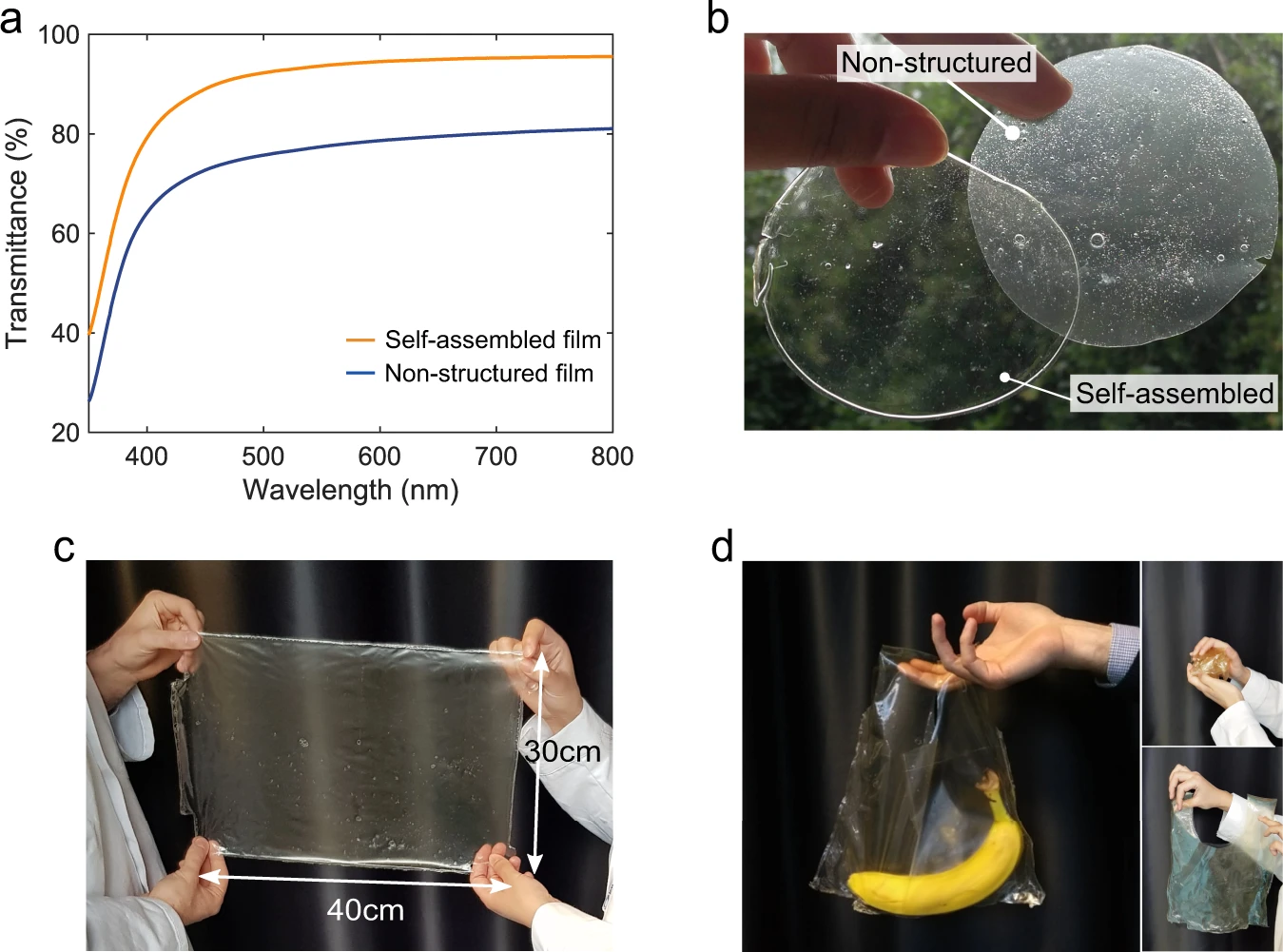
Optical appearance of self-assembled films of sustainable packaging alternative to plastic

A plant proteins-based biodegradable packaging alternative to plastic was developed based on research about spider silk which is known for its high strength and similar on the molecular level.

Researchers at the Agricultural Research Service are looking into using dairy-based films as an alternative to petroleum-based packaging. Instead of being made of synthetic polymers, these dairy-based films would be composed of proteins such as casein and whey, which are found in milk. The films would be biodegradable and offer better oxygen barriers than synthetic, chemical-based films. Another biodegradable polymer, polysaccharides, found in cellulose, chitosan, and starch, can also be used to create the films, coatings, and aerogels for food packaging. More research must be done to improve the water barrier quality of the dairy-based film, but advances in sustainable packaging are actively being pursued.

Sustainable packaging policy cannot be individualized by a specific product. Effective legislation would need to include alternatives to many products, not just a select few; otherwise, the positive impacts of sustainable packing will not be as effective as they need in order to propel a significant reduction of plastic packaging. Finding alternatives can reduce greenhouse gas emissions from unsustainable packaging production and reduce dangerous chemical by-products of unsustainable packaging practices.

== Costs ==
The process of engineering more environmentally acceptable packages can include consideration of the costs. Some companies claim that their environmental packaging program is cost effective. Some alternative materials that are recycled/recyclable and/or less damaging to the environment can lead to companies incurring increased costs. Though this is common when any product begins to carry the true cost of its production (producer pays, producer responsibility laws, take-back laws). There may be an expensive and lengthy process before the new forms of packaging are deemed safe to the public, and approval may take up to two years. For most of the developed world, tightening legislation, and changes in major retailer demand (Walmart's Sustainable Packaging Scorecard for example) the question is no longer "if" products and packaging should become more sustainable, but how-to and how-soon to do it.

== ISO standards ==
The ISO's series of standards relating to packaging and the environment were published in 2013:

- ISO 18601:2013 Packaging and the environment - General requirements for the use of ISO standards in the field of packaging and the environment
- ISO 18602:2013 Packaging and the environment - Optimization of the packaging system
- ISO 18603:2013 Packaging and the environment - Reuse
- ISO 18604:2013 Packaging and the environment - Material recycling
- ISO 18605:2013 Packaging and the environment - Energy recovery
- ISO 18606:2013 Packaging and the environment - Organic recycling

== Criticism ==
Efforts toward "greener" packaging are supported in the sustainability community; however, these are often viewed only as incremental steps and not as an end. Some people foresee a true sustainable steady state economy that may be very different from today's: greatly reduced energy usage, minimal ecological footprint, fewer consumer packaged goods, local purchasing with short food supply chains, little processed foods, etc. Less packaging would be needed in a sustainable carbon neutral economy, which means that fewer packaging options would exist and simpler packaging forms may be necessary.

== See also ==
- Biopolymer
- Cradle to cradle
- Design for the Environment
- Sustainability metric and indices
- Edible packaging
- Ecodesign
- Reusable shopping bag
- Sustainable Design
- Life Cycle Assessment
- Geotextile
