= Low plastic water bottle =

Bottle made with a reduced amount of plastic

A low plastic water bottle is one that uses less plastic than a regular water bottle, typically by having the same internal volume but being made from thinner plastic. Some such bottles have less than half the plastic of a regular water bottle.

The low plastic water bottle has seen an increase in production over the last few years. This is mainly because making low plastic bottles is more efficient, cost-effective, and more environmentally friendly than producing regular bottles. A large number of water companies now exclusively use a low plastic design for their 16.9 oz bottles.

== Recycling ==
Companies have also taken recycling into consideration. Previously when water bottles were bought in packs of 24, there was a plastic wrap around the bottles and there was a cardboard base. This packaging was not recyclable, but now some water companies have made the packaging fully recyclable, and also have eliminated the cardboard base. Eliminating the cardboard base saves 20 million pounds of corrugated material annually. The plastic reduction in the bottles themselves saves 75 million pounds of plastic.

Thinner plastic bottles are harder to recycle. The average yield of PET bottle recycling in Europe dropped from 73% to 63% between 2011 and 2017, with low-plastic bottles being blamed for a higher moisture content in recycling bales, and for producing thinner plastic flakes which are more likely to be discarded during the recycling process.

== See also ==
- Edible water bottle
