= Biodegradation =

Decomposition by living organisms

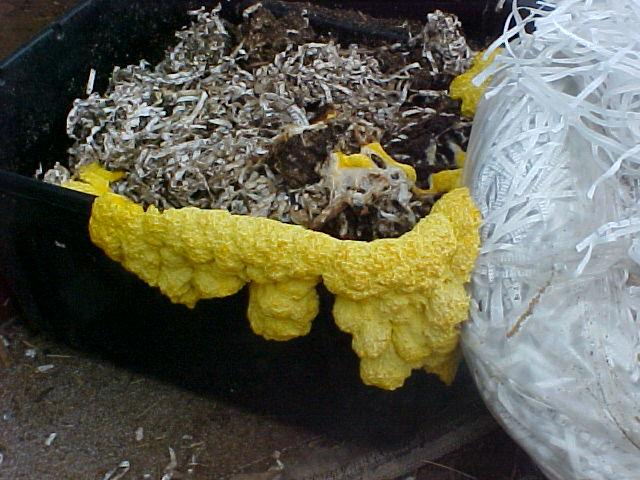
Yellow slime mold growing on a bin of wet paper.

Biodegradation is the breakdown of organic matter by microorganisms, such as bacteria and fungi. (Note: The IUPAC defines biodegradation as "degradation caused by enzymatic process resulting from the action of cells" and notes that the definition is "modified to exclude abiotic enzymatic processes.") In contrast to biodegradation, phytodegradation, which has few applications, relies on green plants to effect the degradation.

In practice, almost all chemical compounds and materials are subject to biodegradation, the limiting element being time. Vegetables may degrade within days, whereas some plastics can take a lot of time to degrade. A standard for biodegradability used by the European Union is that greater than 90% of the original material must be converted into CO_{2}, water, and minerals by biological processes within 6 months. Biodegradation does not apply to elements; thus heavy metal pollutants do not biodegrade.

== Mechanisms ==
The process of biodegradation can be divided into three stages: biodeterioration, biofragmentation, and assimilation. Biodeterioration is sometimes described as a surface-level degradation that modifies the mechanical, physical and chemical properties of the material. This stage occurs when the material is exposed to abiotic factors in the outdoor environment and allows for further degradation by weakening the material's structure. Some abiotic factors that influence these initial changes are compression (mechanical), light, temperature and chemicals in the environment. While biodeterioration typically occurs as the first stage of biodegradation, it can in some cases be parallel to biofragmentation. Hueck, however, defined biodeterioration as the undesirable action of living organisms on Man's materials, involving such things as breakdown of stone facades of buildings, corrosion of metals by microorganisms or merely the esthetic changes induced on man-made structures by the growth of living organisms.

Biofragmentation of a polymer is the lytic process in which bonds within a polymer are cleaved, generating oligomers and monomers in its place. The steps taken to fragment these materials also differ based on the presence of oxygen in the system. The breakdown of materials by microorganisms when oxygen is present is aerobic digestion, and the breakdown of materials when oxygen is not present is anaerobic digestion. The main difference between these processes is that anaerobic reactions produce methane, while aerobic reactions do not (however, both reactions produce carbon dioxide, water, some type of residue, and a new biomass). In addition, aerobic digestion typically occurs more rapidly than anaerobic digestion, while anaerobic digestion does a better job reducing the volume and mass of the material. Due to anaerobic digestion's ability to reduce the volume and mass of waste materials and produce a natural gas, anaerobic digestion technology is widely used for waste management systems and as a source of local, renewable energy.

In the assimilation stage, the resulting products from biofragmentation are then integrated into microbial cells. Some of the products from fragmentation are easily transported within the cell by membrane carriers. However, others still have to undergo biotransformation reactions to yield products that can then be transported inside the cell. Once inside the cell, the products enter catabolic pathways that either lead to the production of adenosine triphosphate (ATP) or elements of the cells structure.

Aerobic biodegradation equation
C_{polymer} + O_{2} → C_{residue} + C_{biomass} + CO_{2} + H_{2}O

Anaerobic biodegradation equation
C_{polymer} → C_{residue} + C_{biomass} + CO_{2} + CH_{4} + H_{2}O

== Factors affecting biodegradation rate ==
Average estimated decomposition times of typical marine debris items. Plastic items are shown in blue.

In practice, almost all chemical compounds and materials are subject to biodegradation processes. The significance, however, is in the relative rates of such processes, such as days, weeks, years or centuries. A number of factors determine the rate at which this degradation of organic compounds occurs. Factors include light, water, oxygen and temperature. The degradation rate of many organic compounds is limited by their bioavailability, which is the rate at which a substance is absorbed into a system or made available at the site of physiological activity, as compounds must be released into solution before organisms can degrade them. The rate of biodegradation can be measured in a number of ways. Respirometry tests can be used for aerobic microbes. First one places a solid waste sample in a container with microorganisms and soil, and then aerates the mixture. Over the course of several days, microorganisms digest the sample bit by bit and produce carbon dioxide – the resulting amount of CO_{2} serves as an indicator of degradation. Biodegradability can also be measured by anaerobic microbes and the amount of methane or alloy that they are able to produce.

It's important to note factors that affect biodegradation rates during product testing to ensure that the results produced are accurate and reliable. Several materials will test as being biodegradable under optimal conditions in a lab for approval but these results may not reflect real world outcomes where factors are more variable. For example, a material may have tested as biodegrading at a high rate in the lab may not degrade at a high rate in a landfill because landfills often lack light, water, and microbial activity that are necessary for degradation to occur. Thus, it is very important that there are standards for plastic biodegradable products, which have a large impact on the environment. The development and use of accurate standard test methods can help ensure that all plastics that are being produced and commercialized will actually biodegrade in natural environments. One test that has been developed for this purpose is DINV 54900.

Recent advances have enabled real-time monitoring of polymer biodegradation using biosensors combined with machine learning, improving the accuracy of degradation assessments under varying environmental conditions.

Approximated time for compounds to biodegrade in a marine environment
Product	Time to Biodegrade
Paper towel	2–4 weeks
Newspaper	6 weeks
Apple core	2 months
Cardboard box	2 months
Wax coated milk carton	3 months
Cotton gloves	1–5 months
Wool gloves	1 year
Plywood	1–3 years
Painted wooden sticks	13 years
Plastic bags	10–20 years
Tin cans	50 years
Disposable diapers	50–100 years
Plastic bottle	100 years
Aluminium cans	200 years
Glass bottles	Undetermined

Time-frame for common items to break down in a terrestrial environment
Vegetables	5 days – 1 month
Paper	2–5 months
Cotton T-shirt	6 months
Orange peels	6 months
Tree leaves	1 year
Wool socks	1–5 years
Plastic-coated paper milk cartons	5 years
Leather shoes	25–40 years
Nylon fabric	30–40 years
Tin cans	50–100 years
Aluminium cans	80–100 years
Glass bottles	1 million years
Styrofoam cup	500 years to forever
Plastic bags	500 years to forever

== Individual material classes ==
=== Polycyclic aromatics ===
Polycyclic aromatics are potential cancer-causing compounds that are produced by processing of petroleum and coal.

=== Plastics ===
The term biodegradable plastics refers to materials that maintain their mechanical strength during practical use but break down into low-weight compounds and non-toxic byproducts after their use. This breakdown is made possible through an attack of microorganisms on the material, which is typically a non-water-soluble polymer. Such materials can be obtained through chemical synthesis, fermentation by microorganisms, and from chemically modified natural products.

Plastics biodegrade at highly variable rates. PVC-based plumbing is selected for handling sewage because PVC resists biodegradation. Some packaging materials on the other hand are being developed that would degrade readily upon exposure to the environment. Examples of synthetic polymers that biodegrade quickly include polycaprolactone, other polyesters and aromatic-aliphatic esters, due to their ester bonds being susceptible to attack by water. A prominent example is poly-3-hydroxybutyrate, the renewably derived polylactic acid. Others are the cellulose-based cellulose acetate and celluloid (cellulose nitrate).

Polylactic acid is an example of a plastic that biodegrades quickly.

Under low oxygen conditions plastics break down more slowly. The breakdown process can be accelerated in specially designed compost heap. Starch-based plastics will degrade within two to four months in a home compost bin, while polylactic acid is largely undecomposed, requiring higher temperatures. Polycaprolactone and polycaprolactone-starch composites decompose slower, but the starch content accelerates decomposition by leaving behind a porous, high surface area polycaprolactone. Nevertheless, it takes many months.

In 2016, a bacterium named Ideonella sakaiensis was found to biodegrade PET. In 2020, the PET degrading enzyme of the bacterium, PETase, has been genetically modified and combined with MHETase to break down PET faster, and also degrade PEF. In 2021, researchers reported that a mix of microorganisms from cow stomachs could break down three types of plastics.

Many plastic producers have gone so far even to say that their plastics are compostable, typically listing corn starch as an ingredient. However, these claims are questionable because the plastics industry operates under its own definition of compostable:

"that which is capable of undergoing biological decomposition in a compost site such that the material is not visually distinguishable and breaks down into carbon dioxide, water, inorganic compounds and biomass at a rate consistent with known compostable materials." (Ref: ASTM D 6002)

The term "composting" is often used informally to describe the biodegradation of packaging materials. Legal definitions exist for compostability, the process that leads to compost. Four criteria are offered by the European Union:

1. Chemical composition: volatile matter and heavy metals as well as fluorine should be limited.
2. Biodegradability: the conversion of >90% of the original material into CO_{2}, water and minerals by biological processes within 6 months.
3. Disintegrability: at least 90% of the original mass should be decomposed into particles that are able to pass through a 2x2 mm sieve.
4. Quality: absence of toxic substances and other substances that impede composting.

== Biodegradable technology ==
Biodegradable technology is established technology with some applications in product packaging, production, and medicine. The chief barrier to widespread implementation is the trade-off between biodegradability and performance. For example, lactide-based plastics are inferior packaging properties in comparison to traditional materials.

Oxo-biodegradation is defined by CEN (the European Standards Organisation) as "degradation resulting from oxidative and cell-mediated phenomena, either simultaneously or successively." While sometimes described as "oxo-fragmentable," and "oxo-degradable" these terms describe only the first or oxidative phase and should not be used for material which degrades by the process of oxo-biodegradation defined by CEN: the correct description is "oxo-biodegradable." Oxo-biodegradable formulations accelerate the biodegradation process but it takes considerable skill and experience to balance the ingredients within the formulations so as to provide the product with a useful life for a set period, followed by degradation and biodegradation.

Biodegradable technology is especially utilized by the bio-medical community. Biodegradable polymers are classified into three groups: medical, ecological, and dual application, while in terms of origin they are divided into two groups: natural and synthetic. The Clean Technology Group is exploiting the use of supercritical carbon dioxide, which under high pressure at room temperature is a solvent that can use biodegradable plastics to make polymer drug coatings. The polymer (meaning a material composed of molecules with repeating structural units that form a long chain) is used to encapsulate a drug prior to injection in the body and is based on lactic acid, a compound normally produced in the body, and is thus able to be excreted naturally. The coating is designed for controlled release over a period of time, reducing the number of injections required and maximizing the therapeutic benefit. Professor Steve Howdle states that biodegradable polymers are particularly attractive for use in drug delivery, as once introduced into the body they require no retrieval or further manipulation and are degraded into soluble, non-toxic by-products. Different polymers degrade at different rates within the body and therefore polymer selection can be tailored to achieve desired release rates.

Other biomedical applications include the use of biodegradable, elastic shape-memory polymers. Biodegradable implant materials can now be used for minimally invasive surgical procedures through degradable thermoplastic polymers. These polymers are now able to change their shape with increase of temperature, causing shape memory capabilities as well as easily degradable sutures. As a result, implants can now fit through small incisions, doctors can easily perform complex deformations, and sutures and other material aides can naturally biodegrade after a completed surgery.

== Biodegradation vs. composting ==
There is no universal definition for biodegradation and there are various definitions of composting, which has led to much confusion between the terms. They are often lumped together; however, they do not have the same meaning. Biodegradation is the naturally occurring breakdown of materials by microorganisms such as bacteria and fungi or other biological activity. Composting is a human-driven process in which biodegradation occurs under a specific set of circumstances. The predominant difference between the two is that one process is naturally occurring and one is human-driven.

Biodegradable material is capable of decomposing without an oxygen source (anaerobically) into carbon dioxide, water, and biomass, but the timeline is not very specifically defined. Similarly, compostable material breaks down into carbon dioxide, water, and biomass; however, compostable material also breaks down into inorganic compounds. The process for composting is more specifically defined, as it is controlled by humans. Essentially, composting is an accelerated biodegradation process due to optimized circumstances. Additionally, the end product of composting not only returns to its previous state, but also generates and adds beneficial microorganisms to the soil called humus. This organic matter can be used in gardens and on farms to help grow healthier plants in the future. Composting more consistently occurs within a shorter time frame since it is a more defined process and is expedited by human intervention. Biodegradation can occur in different time frames under different circumstances, but is meant to occur naturally without human intervention.

This figure represents the different paths of disposal for organic waste.

Even within composting, there are different circumstances under which this can occur. The two main types of composting are at-home versus commercial. Both produce healthy soil to be reused – the main difference lies in what materials are able to go into the process. At-home composting is mostly used for food scraps and excess garden materials, such as weeds. Commercial composting is capable of breaking down more complex plant-based products, such as corn-based plastics and larger pieces of material, like tree branches. Commercial composting begins with a manual breakdown of the materials using a grinder or other machine to initiate the process. Because at-home composting usually occurs on a smaller scale and does not involve large machinery, these materials would not fully decompose in at-home composting. Furthermore, one study has compared and contrasted home and industrial composting, concluding that there are advantages and disadvantages to both.

The following studies provide examples in which composting has been defined as a subset of biodegradation in a scientific context. The first study, "Assessment of Biodegradability of Plastics Under Simulated Composting Conditions in a Laboratory Test Setting," clearly examines composting as a set of circumstances that falls under the category of degradation. Additionally, this next study looked at the biodegradation and composting effects of chemically and physically crosslinked polylactic acid. Notably discussing composting and biodegrading as two distinct terms. The third and final study reviews European standardization of biodegradable and compostable material in the packaging industry, again using the terms separately.

The distinction between these terms is crucial because waste management confusion leads to improper disposal of materials by people on a daily basis. Biodegradation technology has led to massive improvements in how we dispose of waste; there now exist trash, recycling, and compost bins in order to optimize the disposal process. However, if these waste streams are commonly and frequently confused, then the disposal process is not at all optimized. Biodegradable and compostable materials have been developed to ensure more of human waste is able to breakdown and return to its previous state, or in the case of composting even add nutrients to the ground. When a compostable product is thrown out as opposed to composted and sent to a landfill, these inventions and efforts are wasted. Therefore, it is important for citizens to understand the difference between these terms so that materials can be disposed of properly and efficiently.

== Environmental and social effects ==
Plastic pollution from illegal dumping poses health risks to wildlife. Animals often mistake plastics for food, resulting in intestinal entanglement. Slow-degrading chemicals, like polychlorinated biphenyls (PCBs), nonylphenol (NP), and pesticides also found in plastics, can release into environments and subsequently also be ingested by wildlife.

These chemicals also play a role in human health, as consumption of tainted food (in processes called biomagnification and bioaccumulation) has been linked to issues such as cancers, neurological dysfunction, and hormonal changes. A well-known example of biomagnification impacting health in recent times is the increased exposure to dangerously high levels of mercury in fish, which can affect sex hormones in humans.

In efforts to remediate the damages done by slow-degrading plastics, detergents, metals, and other pollutants created by humans, economic costs have become a concern. Marine litter in particular is notably difficult to quantify and review. Researchers at the World Trade Institute estimate that cleanup initiatives' cost (specifically in ocean ecosystems) has hit close to thirteen billion dollars a year. The main concern stems from marine environments, with the biggest cleanup efforts centering around garbage patches in the ocean. The Great Pacific Garbage Patch, a garbage patch the size of Mexico, is located in the Pacific Ocean. It is estimated to be upwards of a million square miles in size. While the patch contains more obvious examples of litter (plastic bottles, cans, and bags), tiny microplastics are nearly impossible to clean up. National Geographic reports that even more non-biodegradable materials are finding their way into vulnerable environments – nearly thirty-eight million pieces a year.

Materials that have not degraded can also serve as shelter for invasive species, such as tube worms and barnacles. When the ecosystem changes in response to the invasive species, resident species and the natural balance of resources, genetic diversity, and species richness is altered. These factors may support local economies in way of hunting and aquaculture, which suffer in response to the change. Similarly, coastal communities which rely heavily on ecotourism lose revenue thanks to a buildup of pollution, as their beaches or shores are no longer desirable to travelers. The World Trade Institute also notes that the communities who often feel most of the effects of poor biodegradation are poorer countries without the means to pay for their cleanup. In a positive feedback loop effect, they in turn have trouble controlling their own pollution sources.

== Etymology of "biodegradable" ==
The first known use of biodegradable in a biological context was in 1959 when it was employed to describe the breakdown of material into innocuous components by microorganisms. Now biodegradable is commonly associated with environmentally friendly products that are part of the earth's innate cycles like the carbon cycle and capable of decomposing back into natural elements.

== See also ==
- Anaerobic digestion
- Assimilation (biology)
- Bioaccumulation
- Biodegradability prediction
- Biodegradable electronics
- Biodegradable polythene film
- Biodegradation (journal)
- Biomagnification
- Bioplastic – bio-based plastics
- Bioremediation
- Decomposition – reduction of the body of a formerly living organism into simpler forms of matter
- Landfill gas monitoring
- List of environment topics
- Microbial biodegradation
- Photodegradation
