= Ideonella =

Scientific classification
- Domain: Bacteria
- Kingdom: Pseudomonadati
- Phylum: Pseudomonadota
- Class: Betaproteobacteria
- Order: Burkholderiales
- Family: Sphaerotilaceae
- Genus: Ideonella; Malmqvist et al. 1994

Type species
- Ideonella dechloratans

Species
- I. azotifigens; I. dechloratans; I. paludis; I. sakaiensis

Genus of bacteria

Ideonella is a genus of bacteria in the family Comamonadaceae.

== Applications ==
=== Ideonella sakaiensis ===
In 2016 I. sakaiensis was shown to degrade PET, a polymer widely used in food containers, bottles and synthetic fibers. Adhered to a low-grade PET film, the bacteria used two novel enzymes, PETase and MHETase, to decompose the plastic into two environmentally benign substances, which served as their main food source.

A colony of I. sakaiensis could completely degrade a low-grade plastic water bottle in six weeks. Higher-grade PET products would require heating and cooling to weaken it before bacteria could start eating.

The bacteria could also be used to reduce industrial waste during plastics manufacturing.
