= John McGeehan =

British research scientist

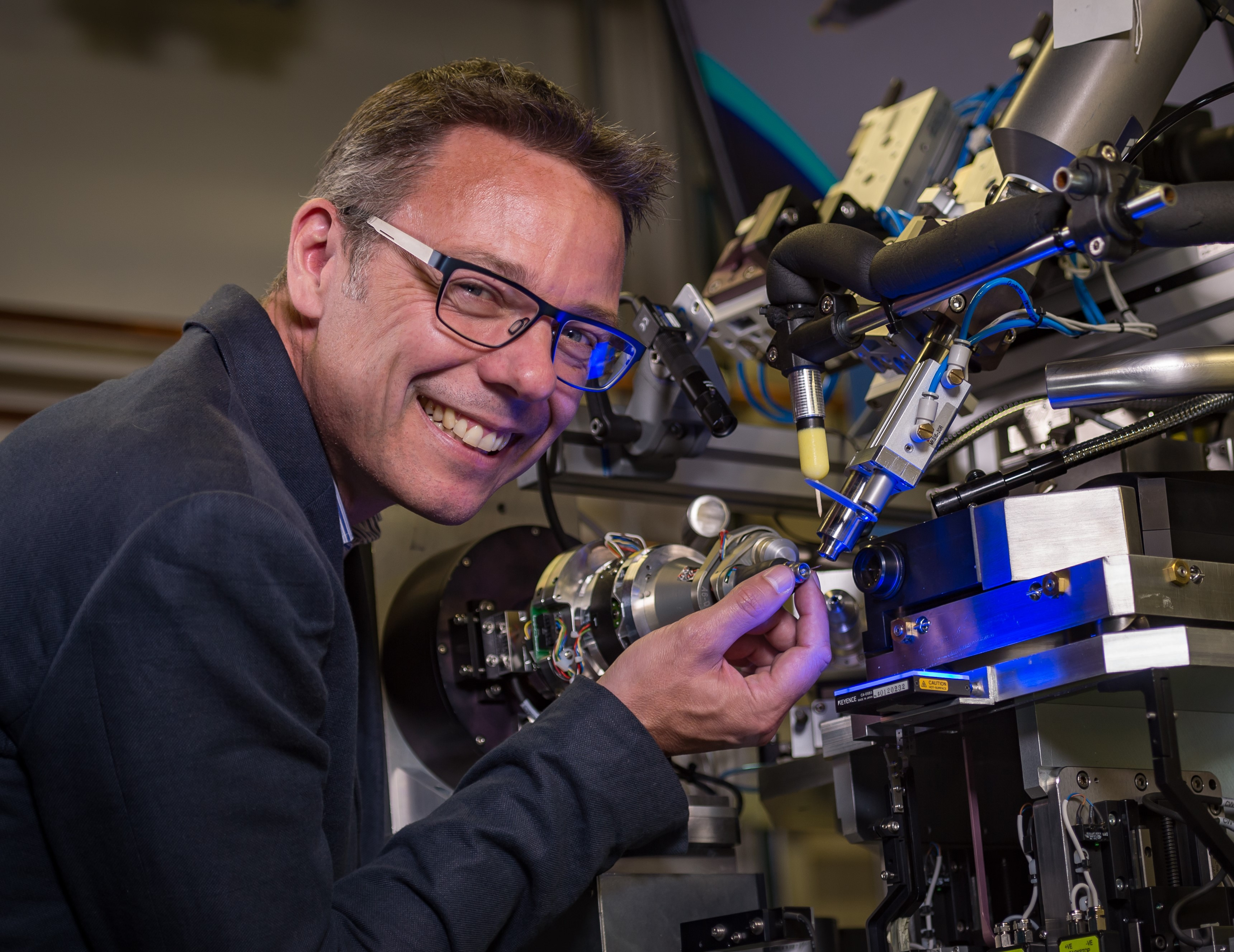
John McGeehan at the Diamond Light Source

John McGeehan is a Scottish research scientist with a focus on sustainability. He was director of the Centre for Enzyme Innovation (CEI) at the University of Portsmouth until 2022, a principal scientist at the National Renewable Energy Laboratory (now NLR), Colorado, USA until 2026, and recently joined the University of Birmingham as a 125^{th} Anniversary Chair and Professor of Engineering Biology.

In 2018, McGeehan co-led an international team of scientists who characterized and engineered an enzyme with the ability to breakdown polyethylene terephthalate (PET), the primary material used in the manufacture of single-use plastic bottles and synthetic textiles. The bacteria that produces this enzyme, Ideonella sakaiensis, was originally discovered and isolated in a recycling plant by a Japanese research group in 2016.

The team at Portsmouth University, together with researchers at NREL and the University of South Florida, solved the high-resolution structure of the PETase enzyme using X-ray crystallography at the Diamond Light Source and used the structure to design improved versions of the enzyme. The initial research story was covered widely in the press (The Times, The Guardian, and The Economist) and television media (BBC, ITV, CNN, CBS, Al Jazeera, and HBO), reaching a global audience of over 2 billion people. The published research was highlighted in the Altmetric Top 100 of all published papers in 2018 and 2020.

Plastics, including PET, while incredibly versatile, are resistant to natural breakdown and represent an increasing source of pollution. Enzymes offer potential routes to breakdown plastics into their original building blocks for reuse, and for the manufacture of advanced materials. The team continues to make further improvements to these enzymes through the characterisation of natural bacterial systems followed by protein engineering in the laboratory. Their latest work employs the use of AlphaFold from DeepMind (video) to uncover the 3D structures of alternative PETases, and other enzymes. A driving force for the team is the use of technoeconomic analysis and life-cycle assessment to guide their research direction, and help understand the economic and environmental impacts of new recycling technologies. Their current focus is on understanding natural processes, bringing these new discoveries into the laboratory, and engineering them towards innovative solutions for industry and the environment.

== Education and memberships ==
McGeehan went to school at Largs Academy in Ayrshire, Scotland, and earned a bachelor's degree in microbiology from the University of Glasgow in 1993, followed by a PhD in virology at the Medical Research Council (MRC) Virology unit, Glasgow. He is a member of the BOTTLE Consortium leadership team, one of the largest US research groups focused on plastic recycling. He is a member of the American Chemical Society, a member of SACNAS, a Fellow of the Royal Society of Biology and a Fellow of the Royal Society of Chemistry.

== Career ==
Following his PhD in Glasgow, McGeehan worked in the Structural Biology Laboratories at the University of York before joining the University of Portsmouth in 2000, where he worked on DNA-binding proteins. In 2005, he obtained a postdoctoral fellowship with the European Molecular Biology Laboratory, Grenoble, France, researching macromolecular crystallography and spectroscopy.

In 2007, he returned to the University of Portsmouth, was awarded a Readership in 2012, and full professorship in 2016. In 2019, McGeehan became the founding director of the Centre for Enzyme Innovation (CEI) at the University of Portsmouth where he led a research team on enzyme engineering. In 2022, he took up the position of secretary general of The World Plastics Association in Monaco, where he co-chaired two international summits. McGeehan co-chaired the inaugural Gordon Research Conference on Plastics Recycling and Upcycling with Gregg T. Beckham in 2023, bringing together 200 researchers to discuss viable solutions to our plastics problem.

McGeehan joined the National Renewable Energy Laboratory in 2024 as a principal scientist in the BioEnergy Science and Technology Group, where he led collaborative projects on the design and application of enzyme-based technologies for plastics and chemicals. In 2026 he took up a 125^{th} Anniversary Chair at the University of Birmingham, UK.

== Research ==
McGeehan has interests in the discovery and engineering of proteins and enzymes for industrial applications.
