= Streptomyces badius =

Scientific classification
- Domain: Bacteria
- Kingdom: Bacillati
- Phylum: Actinomycetota
- Class: Actinomycetes
- Order: Streptomycetales
- Family: Streptomycetaceae
- Genus: Streptomyces
- Species: S. badius

Binomial name
- Streptomyces badius Pridham et al. 1958

Type strain
- 39117, AS 4.1406, ATCC 19729, ATCC 19888, BCRC 13759, CBS 105.60, CBS 468.68, CCRC 13759, CGMCC 4.1406, DSM 40139, ETH 28425, HAMBI 1008, IFO 12745, IMET 43089, INA 1203/53, ISP 5139, JCM 4350, KCC S-0350, KCCS-0350, KCTC 9845, Lanoot R-8718, LMG 19353, NBIMCC 3320, NBRC 12745, NCIMB 13011, NRRL B-2567, NRRL-ISP 5139, R-8718, RIA 1010, VKM Ac-735

Synonyms
- Actinomyces badius

Species of bacterium

Streptomyces badius is a bacterium species from the genus of Streptomyces which has been isolated from soil in Kaukasus in Russia. Streptomyces badius produces cutinase. Streptomyces badius can metabolize quinoxaline.

== See also ==
- List of Streptomyces species
