= McGeehan =

McGeehan may refer to:

- Charles McGeehan (1878–1933), American college sports coach
- Dan McGeehan (1885–1955), American baseball player
- Jessie M. McGeehan (1872–1950), Scottish artist
- John McGeehan, British microbiologist
- John E. McGeehan (1880–1968), American jurist, Justice of the New York Supreme Court, 1933–1950
- Mark McGeehan, USAF pilot that died in 1994 Fairchild Air Force Base B-52 crash
- Mary Kate McGeehan, American actress
- W. O. McGeehan (1879–1933), American sportswriter and editor of the New York Herald Tribune
