= Pseudideonella sakaiensis =

Scientific classification
- Domain: Bacteria
- Kingdom: Pseudomonadati
- Phylum: Pseudomonadota
- Class: Betaproteobacteria
- Order: Burkholderiales
- Family: Sphaerotilaceae
- Genus: Pseudideonella
- Species: P. sakaiensis

Binomial name
- Pseudideonella sakaiensis (Tanasupawat et al. 2016) Lu & Chen 2026

Synonyms
- Ideonella sakaiensis Tanasupawat et al. 2016; Piscinibacter sakaiensis (Tanasupawat et al. 2016) Liu et al. 2023

PET-degrading species of bacterium

Pseudideonella sakaiensis is an aerobic, Gram-negative bacterium in the family Sphaerotilaceae. Formerly known as Ideonella sakaiensis, it is notable for its ability to degrade and assimilate low-crystallinity polyethylene terephthalate (PET), using PET-derived compounds as carbon and energy sources. The type strain, 201-F6, was isolated from a microbial consortium collected at a PET-bottle recycling site in Sakai, Japan.

== Taxonomy ==
The species was originally classified as Ideonella sakaiensis on the basis of its phenotypic characteristics, 16S rRNA gene sequence, and DNA–DNA relatedness to other members of Ideonella. A genome-based taxonomic revision subsequently transferred it to Piscinibacter as Piscinibacter sakaiensis.

Further 16S rRNA and phylogenomic analyses showed that the species occupied a distinct position from both Ideonella and Piscinibacter. It was consequently transferred to the monotypic genus Pseudideonella as Pseudideonella sakaiensis.

== Characteristics ==
Cells of P. sakaiensis are aerobic, non-spore-forming rods measuring approximately 0.6–0.8 μm in width and 1.2–1.5 μm in length. They are motile by means of a polar flagellum. The organism is catalase-positive and oxidase-positive.

The type strain grows at temperatures between 15 and 42 °C, with optimum growth at 30–37 °C. Growth occurs between pH 5.5 and 9.0, with an optimum between pH 7.0 and 7.5.

== PET degradation and assimilation ==
P. sakaiensis produces two enzymes that act sequentially during PET degradation. A secreted PET hydrolase, commonly called PETase, hydrolyzes ester bonds in PET and produces soluble compounds, principally mono(2-hydroxyethyl) terephthalate (MHET), together with smaller amounts of bis(2-hydroxyethyl) terephthalate (BHET) and terephthalic acid (TPA). A second enzyme, MHET hydrolase or MHETase, hydrolyzes MHET into TPA and ethylene glycol. The resulting monomers can be transported into the cell and metabolized.

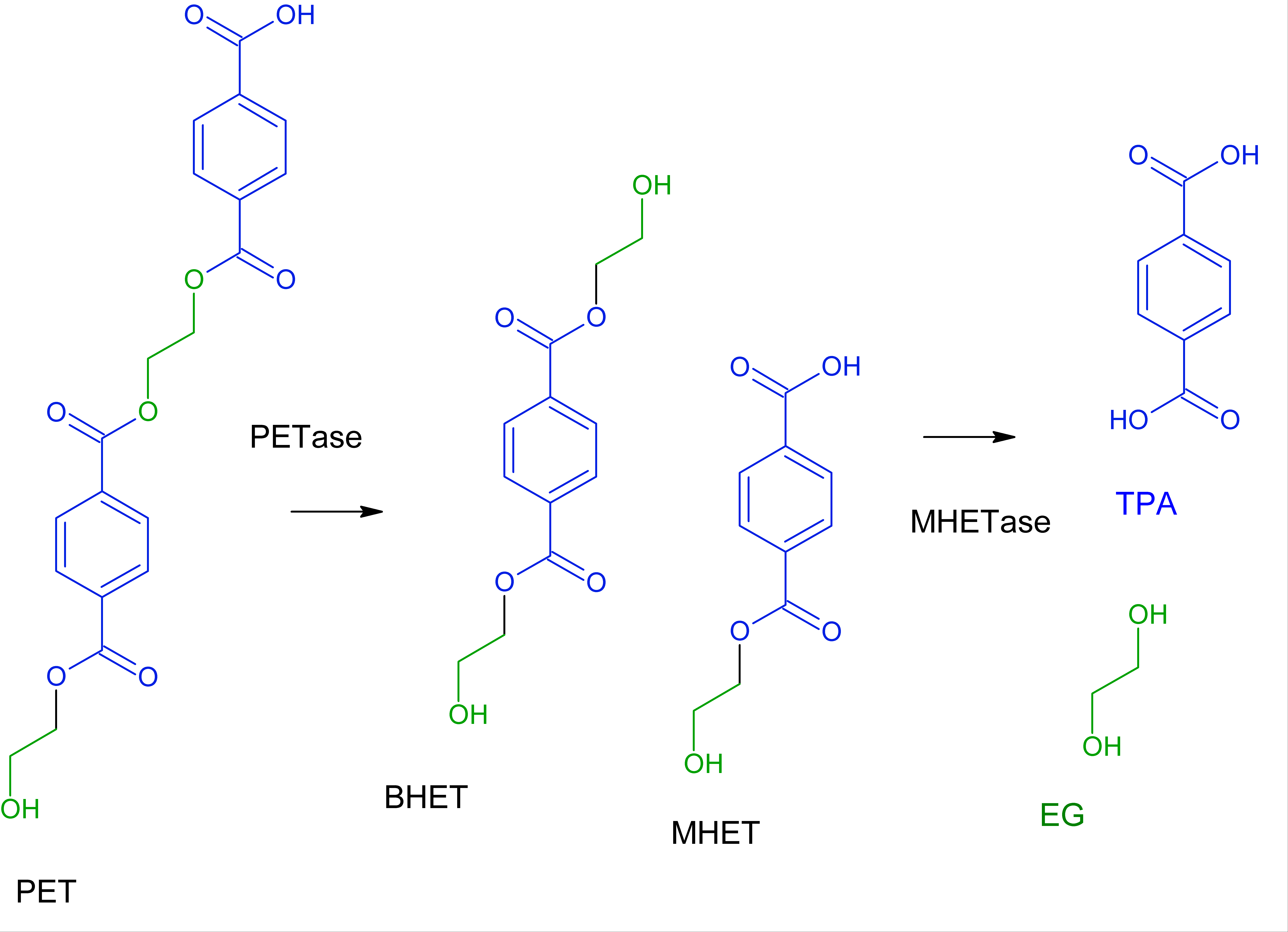
Simplified pathway for PET hydrolysis by PETase and MHETase.

Under laboratory conditions, the wild-type bacterium degraded a thin film of low-crystallinity PET over approximately six weeks at 30 °C. Its activity is strongly affected by the physical properties of the polymer. Amorphous PET films and amorphous portions of consumer containers can support bacterial growth, whereas highly crystalline PET from the main body of plastic water bottles does not support comparable growth or degradation.

== Enzyme engineering ==
PETase and MHETase have been investigated as components of enzymatic PET-recycling systems. Combining the two enzymes increased PET depolymerization by preventing the accumulation of MHET. Engineered fusion proteins containing PETase and MHETase also displayed greater activity than the separate wild-type enzymes under experimental conditions.

An engineered variant derived from the PETase of P. sakaiensis, called FAST-PETase, was developed using structure-based machine learning. It showed increased activity and stability between 30 and 50 °C and depolymerized a range of post-consumer, predominantly amorphous PET products under laboratory conditions. Thermal pretreatment was still required for complete degradation of an entire PET water bottle.

== See also ==
- Biodegradation of plastic
- PET bottle recycling
- Plastivore
