= Ideonella paludis =

Scientific classification
- Domain: Bacteria
- Kingdom: Pseudomonadati
- Phylum: Pseudomonadota
- Class: Betaproteobacteria
- Order: Burkholderiales
- Family: Comamonadaceae
- Genus: Ideonella
- Species: I. paludis

Binomial name
- Ideonella paludis Sheu et al. 2016

Type strain
- BCRC 80524, KBP-31, KCTC 32238

Species of bacterium

Ideonella paludis is a Gram-negative, strictly aerobic and motile bacterium from the genus of Ideonella which has been isolated from water from the Banping Lake in Taiwan.
