= Ideonella dechloratans =

Scientific classification
- Domain: Bacteria
- Kingdom: Pseudomonadati
- Phylum: Pseudomonadota
- Class: Betaproteobacteria
- Order: Burkholderiales
- Family: Comamonadaceae
- Genus: Ideonella
- Species: I. dechloratans

Binomial name
- Ideonella dechloratans Malmqvist et al. 1994

Type strain
- ATCC 51718, CCUG 30977, CCUG 30898, CIP 104251

Synonyms
- Anoxobacterium dechloraticum

Species of bacterium

Ideonella dechloratans is a chlorate-respiring bacterium from the genus Ideonella and family Comamonadaceae.
