= Biodegradation (journal) =

- Discipline: Biodegradation
- Language: English
- Edited by: Claudia K. Gunsch

Publication details
- History: Founded 1990
- Publisher: Springer Science+Business Media
- Open access: Hybrid
- Impact factor: 3.909 (2020)

Standard abbreviations
- ISO 4: Biodegradation

Indexing
- ISSN: 0923-9820 (print); 1572-9729 (web)

Links
- Journal homepage

Biodegradation is a peer-reviewed scientific journal covering biotransformation, mineralization, detoxification, recycling, amelioration or treatment of chemicals or waste materials by naturally occurring microbial strains, microbial associations or recombinant organisms.

According to the Journal Citation Reports, the journal has a 2020 impact factor of 3.909. The editor-in-chief of the journal is Claudia K. Gunsch (Duke University).
