= Polycyclohexylenedimethylene terephthalate =

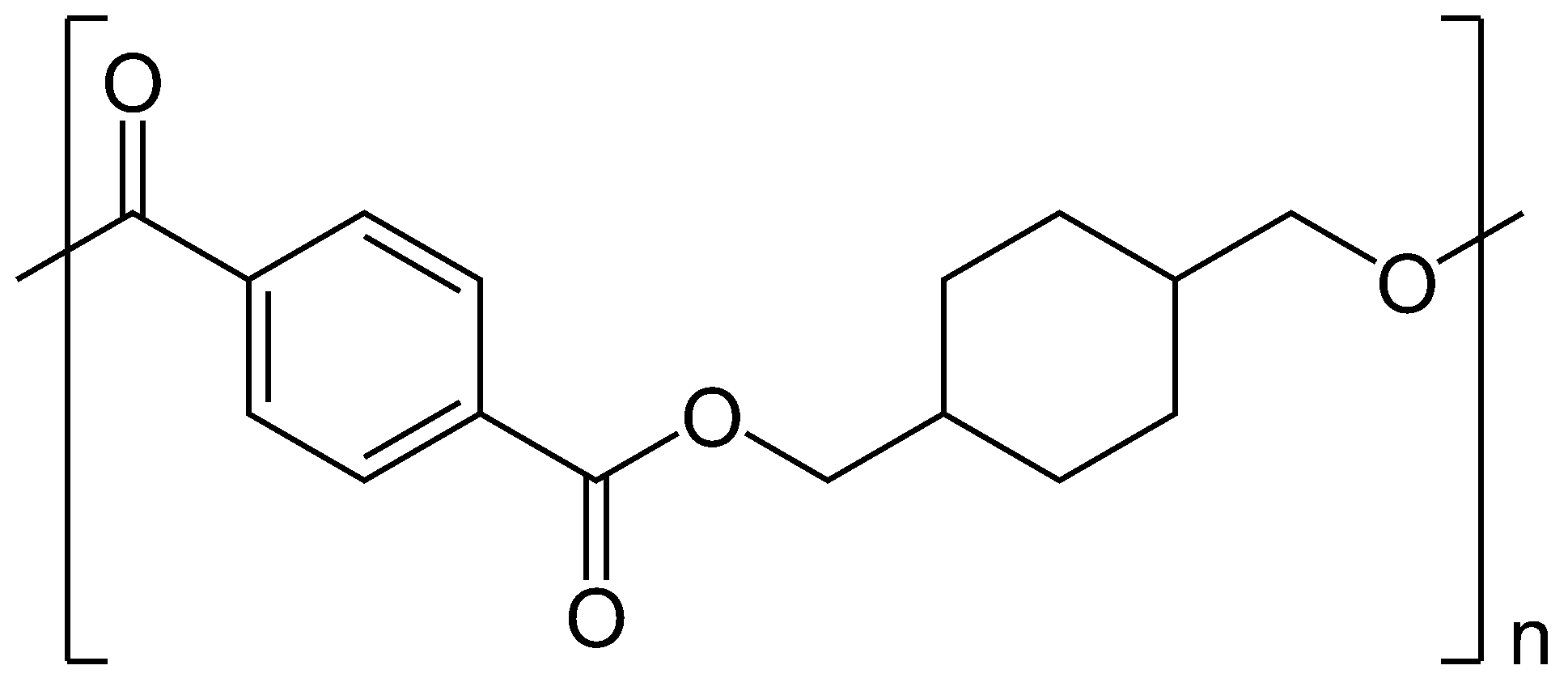

Identifiers
CAS Number	25135-20-0
ChemSpider	none
CompTox Dashboard (EPA)	DTXSID30947999

Properties
Melting point	285 °C (545 °F; 558 K)
- Except where otherwise noted, data are given for materials in their standard state (at 25 °C [77 °F], 100 kPa). Infobox references

Polycyclohexylenedimethylene terephthalate (PCT) is a thermoplastic polyester formed from the polycondensation of terephthalic acid and cyclohexanedimethanol. Its chemical structure is similar to that of polyethylene terephthalate (PET), with which it shares properties like dimensional stability and chemical resistance. PCT is also particularly resistant to high temperatures and hydrolysis. The melting point is 285 °C (545 °F). Common brand names are Thermx (Ticona), Eastar (Eastman) and SkyPURA (SK Chemicals).

== Application ==
Polycyclohexylenedimethylene terephthalate has good dimensional stability at excess temperatures (short-term up to 256 °C (493 °F)) making this material suitable for injection molding or 3D printing of thin-walled parts. PCT is used for electronics components like plug connectors. PCT is also processed into filaments, fibers, and fabrics that are used in industry as filters. The color stability and lower density are of advantage in other applications, especially in the LED reflector application.

== PCTG ==
PCTG is a modified version of PCT with added glycol, which improves its mechanical properties and processing characteristics, similar to PET vs. PETG and often used as 3D printing filament.
