= Ideonella azotifigens =

Scientific classification
- Domain: Bacteria
- Kingdom: Pseudomonadati
- Phylum: Pseudomonadota
- Class: Betaproteobacteria
- Order: Burkholderiales
- Family: Comamonadaceae
- Genus: Ideonella
- Species: I. azotifigens

Binomial name
- Ideonella azotifigens Noar and Buckley 2009, sp. nov.

Type strain
- 1a22T, JCM 15503T, DSM 21438T

Species of bacterium

Ideonella azotifigens is a nitrogen-fixing, Gram-negative, oxidase- and weak catalase-positive aerobic, motile bacterium from the genus Ideonella and family Comamonadaceae, which was isolated from grass rhizosphere soil in Ithaca in the United States.
