= Bis(2-Hydroxyethyl) terephthalate =

Names
- Preferred IUPAC name Bis(2-hydroxyethyl) benzene-1,4-dicarboxylate
- Other names Bis(2-hydroxyethyl) terephthalate

Identifiers
CAS Number	959-26-2
3D model (JSmol)	Interactive image
ChemSpider	13144
ECHA InfoCard	100.012.270
PubChem CID	13739
UNII	J61IL5R964
CompTox Dashboard (EPA)	DTXSID3052644
- InChI: InChI=1S/C12H14O6/c13-5-7-17-11(15)9-1-2-10(4-3-9)12(16)18-8-6-14/h1-4,13-14H,5-8H2 Key: QPKOBORKPHRBPS-UHFFFAOYSA-N; InChI=1/C12H14O6/c13-5-7-17-11(15)9-1-2-10(4-3-9)12(16)18-8-6-14/h1-4,13-14H,5-8H2 Key: QPKOBORKPHRBPS-UHFFFAOYAN
- SMILES: O=C(OCCO)c1ccc(C(=O)OCCO)cc1

Properties
Chemical formula	C_{12}H_{14}O_{6}
Molar mass	254.238 g·mol^{−1}
Appearance	White powder
Density	1.3 (±0.1) g/cm^{3}
Melting point	106 °C
Solubility in water	0.593 g/L

Hazards
Flash point	172.0 (±19.4) °C
- Except where otherwise noted, data are given for materials in their standard state (at 25 °C [77 °F], 100 kPa). Infobox references

Bis(2-Hydroxyethyl) terephthalate (BHET) is an organic compound; it is the ester of ethylene glycol and terephthalic acid. Together with 2-hydroxyethyl terephthalic acid, bis(2-Hydroxyethyl) terephthalate is an intermediate in the production of poly(ethylene terephthalate). It is the product of the hydrolysis reaction of PET with Ethylene glycol.
