= Polyethylene furan-2,5-dicarboxylate =

Names
- Other names Polyethylene furanoate; Polyethylene furandicarboxylate; Poly(ethylene furanoate)

Identifiers
CAS Number	28728-19-0

Properties
Chemical formula	(C_{8}H_{6}O_{5})_{n}
Molar mass	Variable
Density	1.43 g/cm^{3}
Melting point	195–265 °C (383–509 °F; 468–538 K)
- Except where otherwise noted, data are given for materials in their standard state (at 25 °C [77 °F], 100 kPa). Infobox references

Polyethylene furan-2,5-dicarboxylate, also named poly(ethylene furan-2,5-dicarboxylate), polyethylene furanoate and poly(ethylene furanoate) and generally abbreviated as PEF, is a polymer that can be produced by polycondensation or ring-opening polymerization of 2,5-furandicarboxylic acid (FDCA) and ethylene glycol. As an aromatic polyester from ethylene glycol it is a chemical analogue of polyethylene terephthalate (PET) and polyethylene naphthalate (PEN). PEF has been described in (patent) literature since 1951, but has gained renewed attention since the US department of energy proclaimed its building block, FDCA, as a potential bio-based replacement for purified terephthalic acid (PTA) in 2004.

== Benefits over PET ==
One life-cycle assessment showed that replacing PTA in the production of PET by bio-based FDCA for the production of PEF has a potential for significant reductions in greenhouse gas (GHG) emissions and non-renewable energy use (NREU). Furthermore, PEF exhibits an intrinsically higher gas barrier for oxygen, carbon dioxide and water vapor than PET and is therefore an interesting alternative for packaging applications such as bottles, films and food trays.
