= PETase =

Class of enzymes

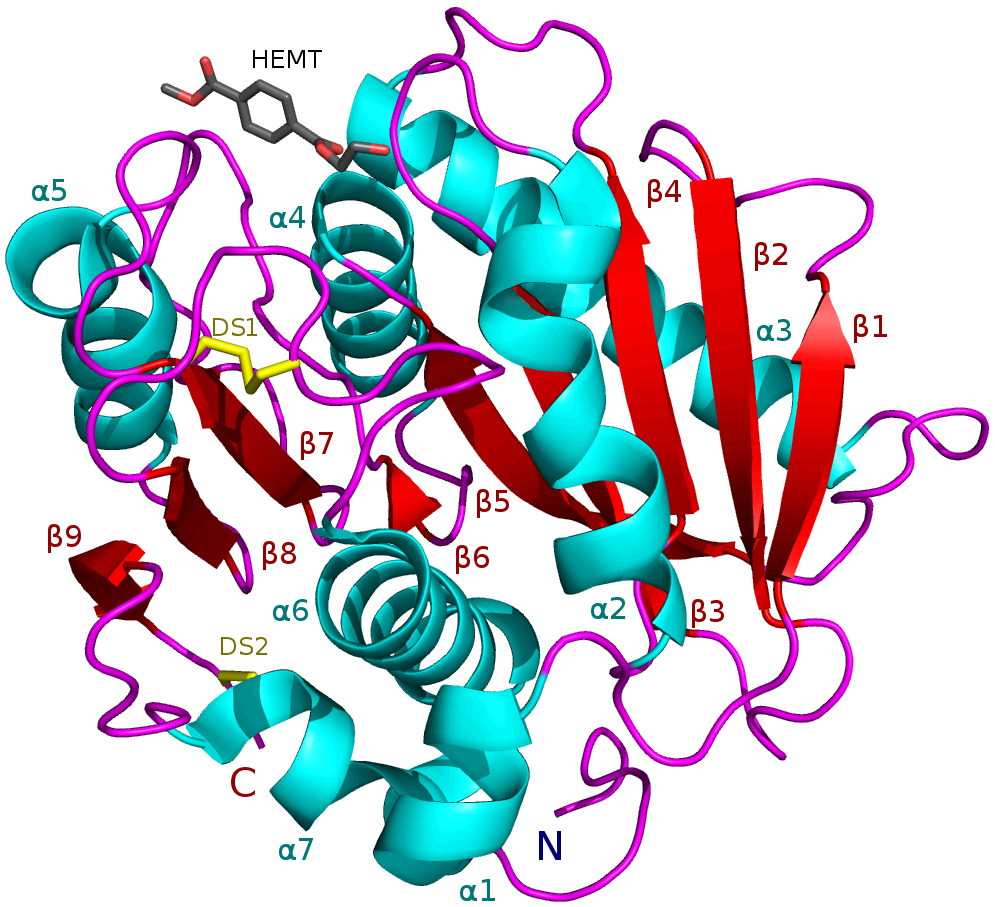
- I. sakaiensis PETase (A0A0K8P6T7) in complex with HEMT, a PET analogue (PDB: 5XH3).

Identifiers
- EC no.: 3.1.1.101
- Alt. names: PET hydrolase, poly(ethylene terephthalate) hydrolase

Databases
- BRENDA: enzyme data
- ExPASy: NiceZyme view
- KEGG: enzyme entry
- MetaCyc: metabolic pathway
- Rhea: reactions
- PDB structures: RCSB PDB PDBe PDBsum
Search
- PMC: articles
- PubMed: articles
- NCBI: proteins

PETases are an esterase class of enzymes that catalyze the breakdown (via hydrolysis) of polyethylene terephthalate (PET) plastic to monomeric mono-2-hydroxyethyl terephthalate (MHET).

The idealized chemical reaction is:

(ethylene terephthalate)_{n} + H_{2}O → (ethylene terephthalate)_{n-1} + MHET,

where n is the number of monomers in the polymer chain, though a trace amount of the PET breaks down instead to bis(2-hydroxyethyl) terephthalate (BHET). PETases can also break down PEF-plastic (polyethylene-2,5-furandicarboxylate), which is a bioderived PET replacement, into the analogous MHEF. PETases can't catalyze the hydrolysis of alkyl polyesters like polybutylene succinate or polylactic acid.

Whereas the degradation of PET by natural (non-enzymatic) means will take hundreds of years, PETases can degrade it in a matter of days.

== History ==
The first PETase was discovered in 2016 from Ideonella sakaiensis strain 201-F6 bacteria found from sludge samples collected close to a Japanese PET bottle recycling site. There were other types of hydrolases previously known to degrade PET, including lipases, esterases, and cutinases. For comparison, enzymes that degrade polyester have been known to exist at least as far back as 1975 (in the case of α-chymotrypsin) and 1977 (lipase).

PET plastic came into widespread use in the 1970s and it has been suggested that PETases in bacteria evolved only recently. PETase may have had past enzymatic activity associated with the degradation of polyester natural products made by angiosperms.

== Structure ==
As of April 2019, there were 17 known three-dimensional crystal structures of PETases: 6QGC, 6ILX, 6ILW, 5YFE, 6EQD, 6EQE, 6EQF, 6EQG, 6EQH, 6ANE, 5XJH, 5YNS, 5XFY, 5XFZ, 5XG0, 5XH2 and 5XH3.

PETase exhibits shared qualities with both lipases and cutinases in that it possesses an α/β-hydrolase fold; although, the active-site cleft observed in PETase is more open than in cutinases. The Ideonella sakaiensis PETase is similar to dienelactone hydrolase, according to Pfam. According to ESTHER, it falls into the Polyesterase-lipase-cutinase family.

There are approximately 69 PETase-like enzymes comprising a variety of diverse organisms, and there are two classifications of these enzymes including type I and type II. It is suggested that 57 enzymes fall into the type I category whereas the rest fall into the type II group, including the PETase enzyme found in the Ideonella sakaiensis. Within all 69 PETase-like enzymes, there exists the same three residues within the active site, suggesting that the catalytic mechanism is the same in all forms of PETase-like enzymes.

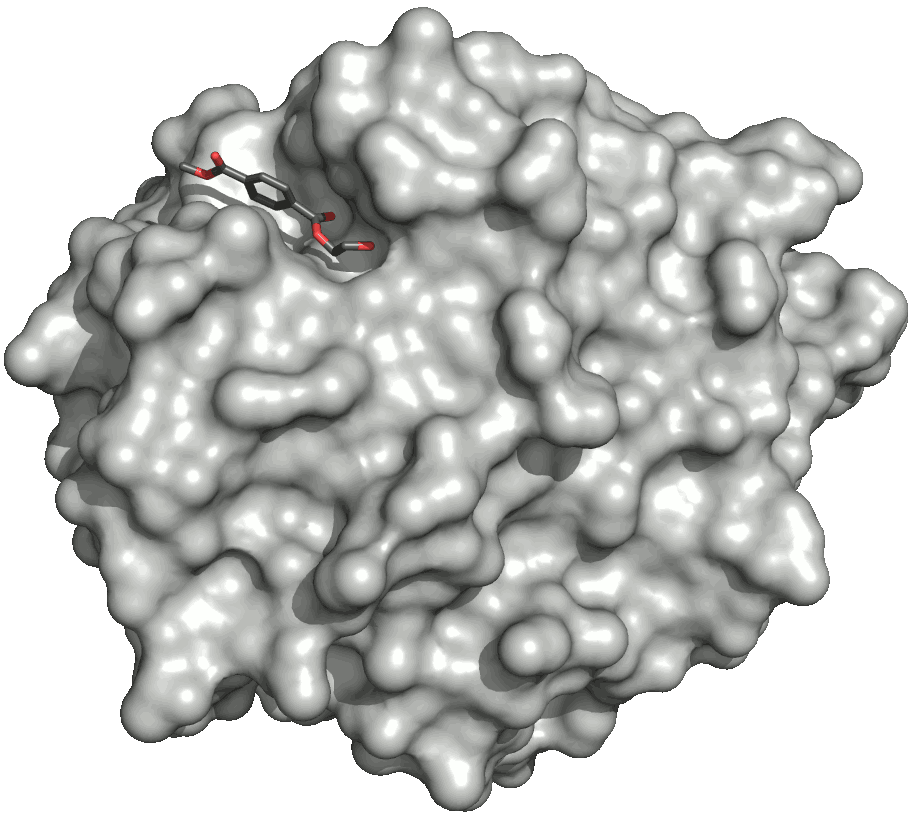
Surface of the PETase double mutant (R103G and S131A) with HEMT (1-(2-hydroxyethyl) 4-methyl terephthalate) bound to its active site. HEMT is an analogue of MHET, and has an additional methanol esterified to it. PDBID: 5XH3.

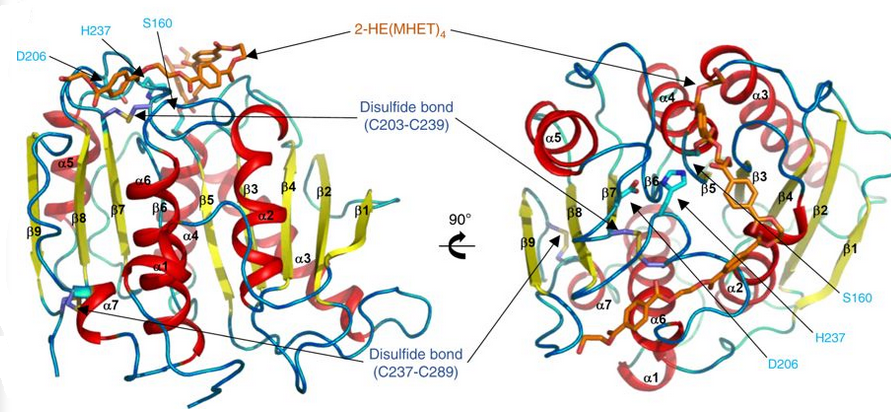
Ribbon diagram of PETase with three residues Ser160, Asp206, and His237. The catalytic triad is represented by cyan-colored sticks. The active site is shown in orange to represent stimulation by a 2-HE(MHET)_{4} molecule.

== Mutations ==
The discovery of PETase from I. sakaiensis provides a potential solution to the world’s amassing plastic; however, naturally occurring enzymes are limited in their degradation abilities due to instability, low activity, and expression levels, which ultimately drive the need for improvement if they are to be used for large-scale industrial applications. The majority of strategies implement site-directed mutagenesis to create an improved version, known as a variant or mutant, of the enzyme. One variant increased the activity of PETase by 22.4% by replacing the arginine with alanine in the amino acid chain at the 280th position. Similarly, a double mutant was created to constrict the active site and became 4.13% more active than the wildtype. Comparatively, two other double mutants created extra hydrogen bonds that improved the stability of PETase. Other successful approaches to improving PETase stability include adding Ca^{2+} or Mg^{2+}, disulfide bonds and salt bridges as well as glycosylation. For thermal stability, another double mutant displayed an increase in comparison to the wild type. Moreover, the β1-β2 connecting loop of the enzyme may also be a future target for improved thermal stability due to its flexibility and distance from the active site.

== Biological pathway ==
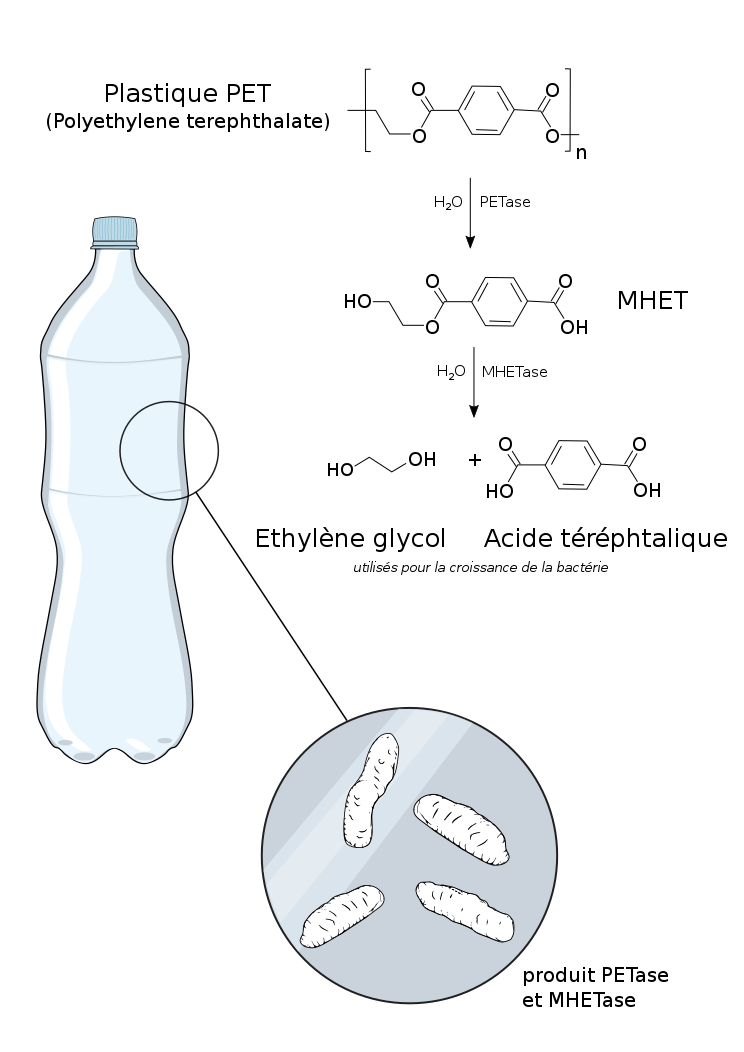
PETase and MHETase reaction pathway.

In I. sakaiensis, the resultant MHET is further broken down by the action of MHETase enzyme to terephthalic acid and ethylene glycol. Laboratory experiments showed that chimeric proteins that artificially link a MHETase and a PETase outperform similar mixtures of free enzymes.

== See also ==
- Plastivore
- Galleria mellonella, a caterpillar that can digest polyethylene.
- Aspergillus tubingensis and Pestalotiopsis microspora - fungi that can digest polyurethane.
- Cutinase, an esterase enzyme of similar geometric shape
