= MHETase =

Hydrolase enzyme

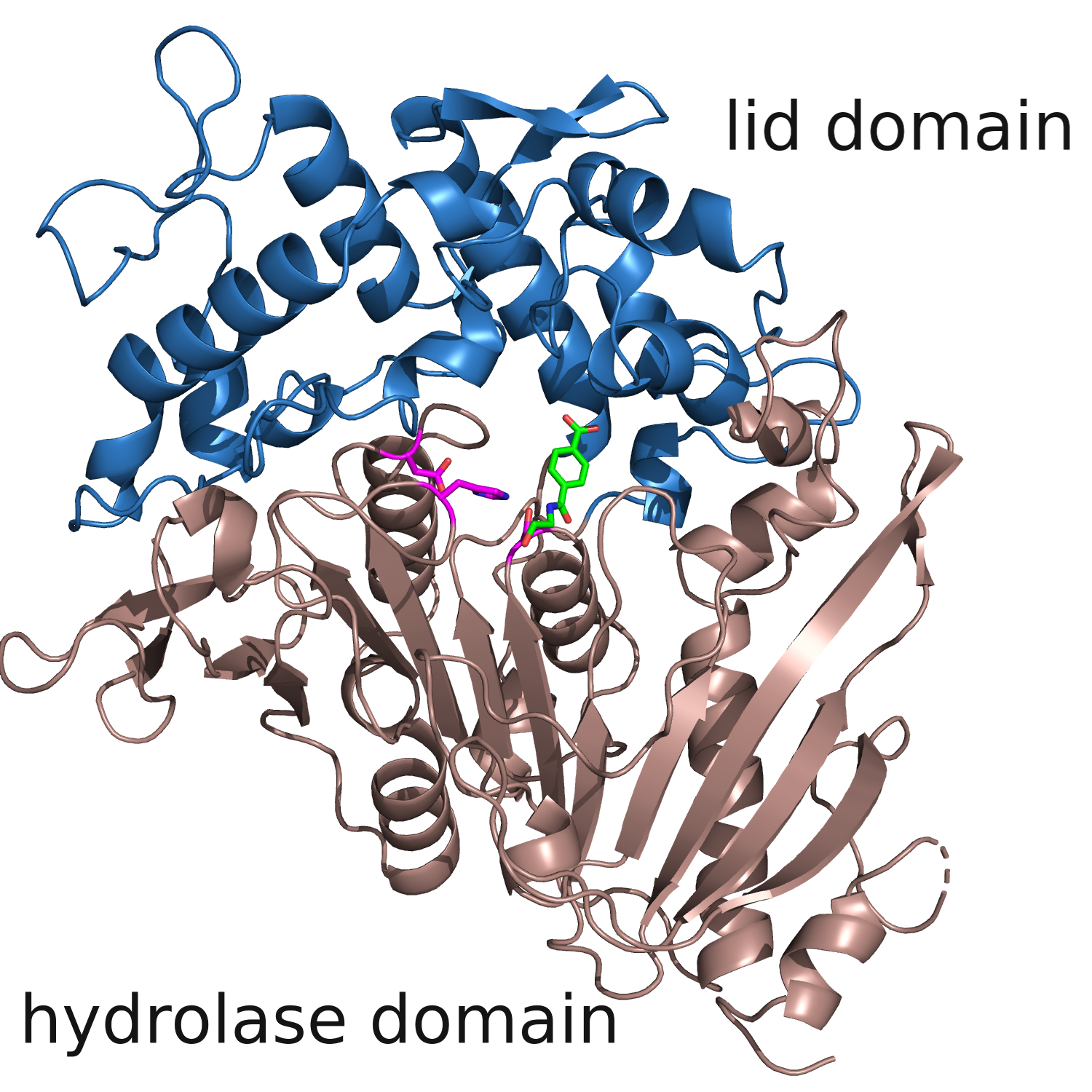
- MHETase ribbon diagram (PDB: 6QGA). The hydrolase domain is shown in brown including the catalytic rsidues in magenta. The lid domain is shown in blue. The substrate analogue monohydroxyethylterphthalamide is shown in green.

Identifiers
- EC no.: 3.1.1.102
- Alt. names: MHET hydrolase, monohydroxyethyl terephthalate hydrolase

Databases
- BRENDA: enzyme data
- ExPASy: NiceZyme view
- KEGG: enzyme entry
- MetaCyc: metabolic pathway
- Rhea: reactions
- PDB structures: RCSB PDB PDBe PDBsum
Search
- PMC: articles
- PubMed: articles
- NCBI: proteins

The enzyme MHETase is a hydrolase that cleaves 2-hydroxyethyl terephthalic acid to ethylene glycol and terephthalic acid. Discovered in 2016, this and the related enzyme PETase are used by the bacterium Ideonella sakaiensis to live on the plastic PET (polyethylene terephthalate) as sole carbon source. Since >80M tons of PET are produced annually, great interest has been shown in its biodegradation or recycling.

== Chemical reaction ==
The first enzyme of the PET degradation pathway, PETase, cleaves this plastic into the intermediates MHET (Mono-(2-hydroxyethyl)terephthalic acid) and minor amounts BHET (Bis-(2-hydroxyethyl)terephthalic acid). MHETase hydrolyses the ester bond of MHET forming terephthalic acid and ethylene glycol.

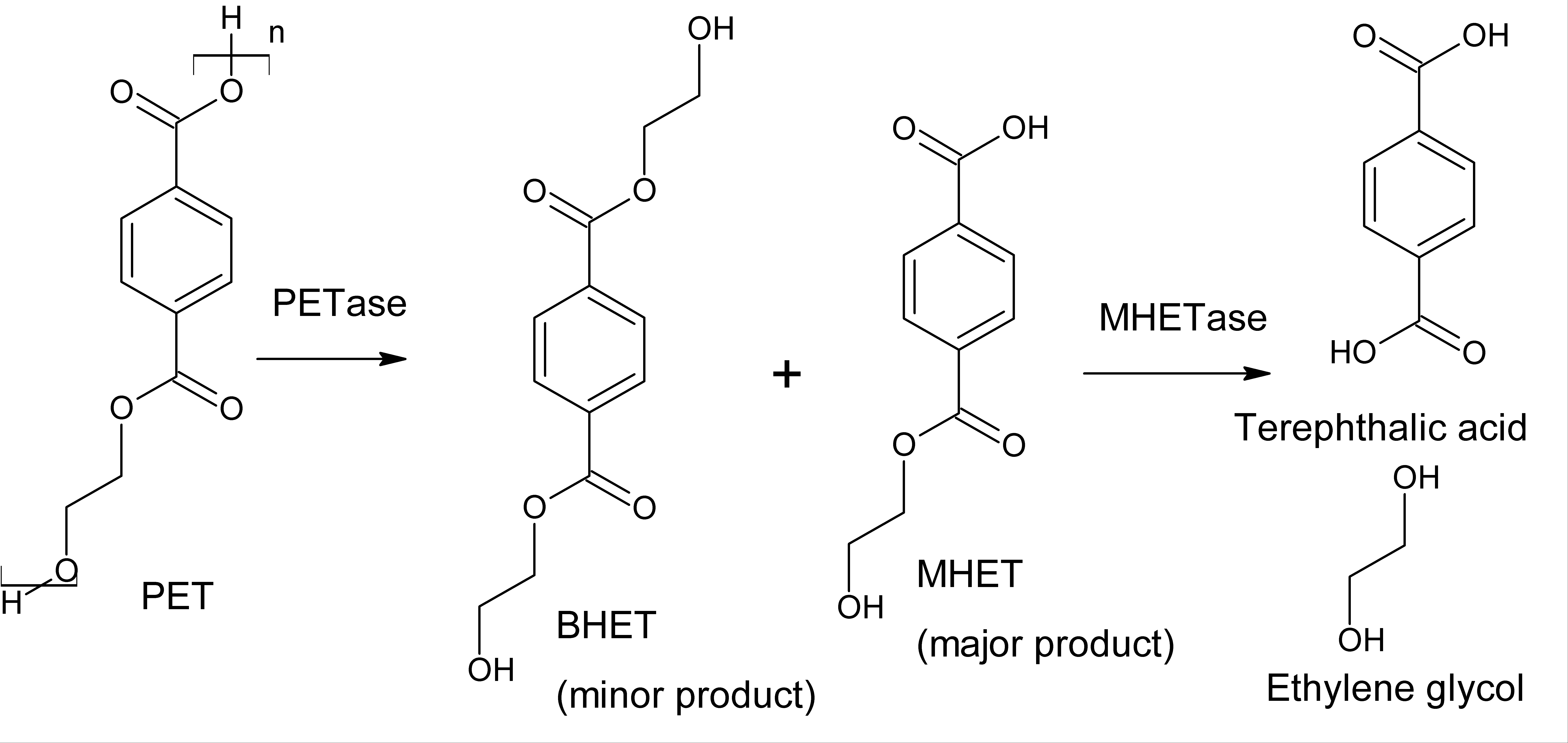
Enzymatic PET degradation by PETase and MHETase

Besides its natural substrate MHET the chromogenic substrate MpNPT, mono-p-nitrophenyl-terephthalate, is also hydrolyzed well. This can be used to measure the enzymatic activity and determine the kinetic parameters. Ferulate and gallate esters, substrates of the closest relatives in the tannase family, are not converted. p-Nitrophenyl ester of aliphatic monocarboxylic acids like the widely used esterase substrate p-nitrophenyl acetate are not hydrolyzed either.

The native enzyme is incapable of working on BHET, mono(2-hydroxyethyl)-isophthalate (MHEI), or mono(2-hydroxyethyl)-furanoate (MHEF). MHEI is a likely industrial PET degradation product due to the use of isophthalate comonomer. MHEF is a product of PEF degradation by PETase. Protein engineering research aims to overcome these barriers.

== Structure ==
The structure of MHETase was solved in 2019. It shows the common fold of the alpha/beta hydrolase superfamily. According to the classification in the ESTHER database, MHETase belongs to the family of tannases within block X. This family mainly contains tannases und feruloyl esterases. The enzyme consists of two domains: the hydrolase domain harbors the catalytic residues Ser225, His528 and Asp492; the lid domain contributes most of the residues of the substrate binding site.

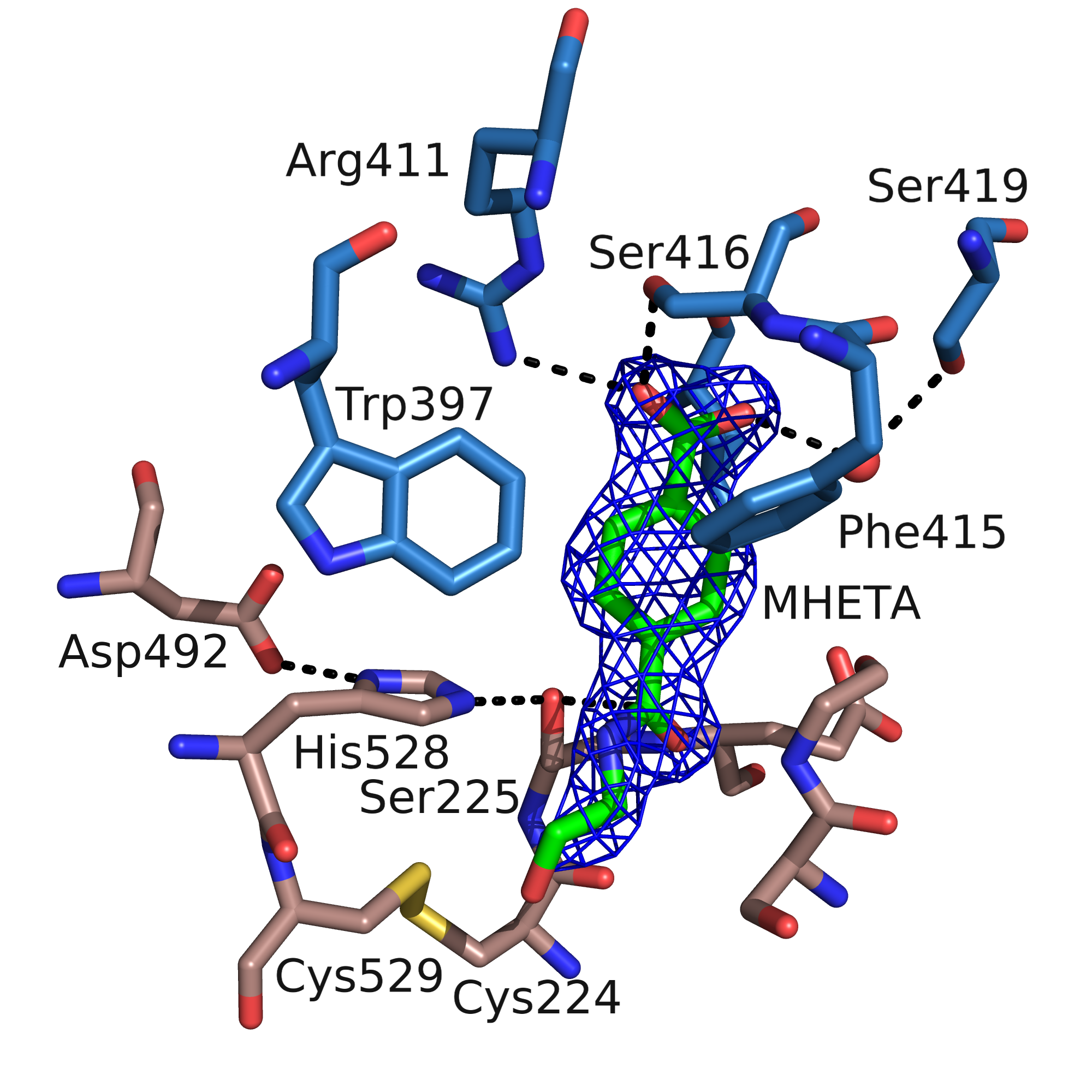
MHETA bound to MHETase. Short distances between the non-hydrolyzable ligand MHETA (mono hydroxyethyl terephthalamide in green) and the catalytic residues Ser225, His528 and Asp492 (part of the hydrolase domain in brown) or ligand binding residues (part of the lid domain in blue) are shown as dashed lines. PDB: 6QGC
