= 2-Hydroxyethyl terephthalic acid =

Names
- Preferred IUPAC name 4-[(2-Hydroxyethoxy)carbonyl]benzoic acid
- Other names 1,4-Benzenedicarboxylic acid, 1-(2-hydroxyethyl) ester

Identifiers
CAS Number	1137-99-1
3D model (JSmol)	Interactive image
ChEBI	CHEBI:131735
ChemSpider	151881
EC Number	875-651-4
KEGG	C21450
PubChem CID	174073
UNII	8DN7KSY2WN
CompTox Dashboard (EPA)	DTXSID60622186
- InChI: InChI=1S/C10H10O5/c11-5-6-15-10(14)8-3-1-7(2-4-8)9(12)13/h1-4,11H,5-6H2,(H,12,13) Key: BCBHDSLDGBIFIX-UHFFFAOYSA-N
- SMILES: C1=CC(=CC=C1C(=O)O)C(=O)OCCO

Properties
Chemical formula	C_{10}H_{10}O_{5}
Molar mass	210.185 g·mol^{−1}
Appearance	White solid
Melting point	183–186 °C (361–367 °F; 456–459 K)

Hazards
- GHS labelling
Pictograms	(GHS07: Exclamation mark)
Signal word	Warning
Hazard statements	H302, H315, H319, H335
Precautionary statements	P261, P264, P264+P265, P270, P271, P280, P301+P317, P302+P352, P304+P340, P305+P351+P338, P319, P321, P330, P332+P317, P337+P317, P362+P364, P403+P233, P405, P501
- Except where otherwise noted, data are given for materials in their standard state (at 25 °C [77 °F], 100 kPa). Infobox references

2-Hydroxyethyl terephthalic acid is an organic compound with the formula HOC_{2}H_{4}O_{2}CC_{6}H_{4}CO_{2}H. It is the monoester of terephthalic acid and ethylene glycol. The compound is a precursor to poly(ethylene terephthalate) (PET), a polymer that is produced on a large scale industrially. 2-Hydroxyethyl terephthalic acid is a colorless solid that is soluble in water and polar organic solvents. Near neutral pH, 2-hydroxyethyl terephthalic acid converts to 2-hydroxyethyl terephthalate, HOC_{2}H_{4}O_{2}CC_{6}H_{4}CO_{2}^{−}.

== Occurrence and reactions ==
2-Hydroxyethyl terephthalic acid is an intermediate in both the formation and hydrolysis of PET. It is produced on a massive scale as the first intermediate in certain routes to PET. Specifically, it is produced in the course of the thermal condensation of terephthalic acid and ethylene glycol:

HOC_{2}H_{4}OH + HO_{2}CC_{6}H_{4}CO_{2}H → HOC_{2}H_{4}O_{2}CC_{6}H_{4}CO_{2}H + H_{2}O

Further dehydration of 2-hydroxyethyl terephthalic acid gives PET.

It is also produced by the partial hydrolysis of PET, as catalyzed by the enzyme PETase. It is substrate for the enzyme MHETase.

H[O_{2}CC_{6}H_{4}CO_{2}C_{2}H_{4}]_{n}OH + (n−1) H_{2}O → n HO_{2}CC_{6}H_{4}CO_{2}C_{2}H_{4}OH
