= Polyethylene terephthalate =

Polymer

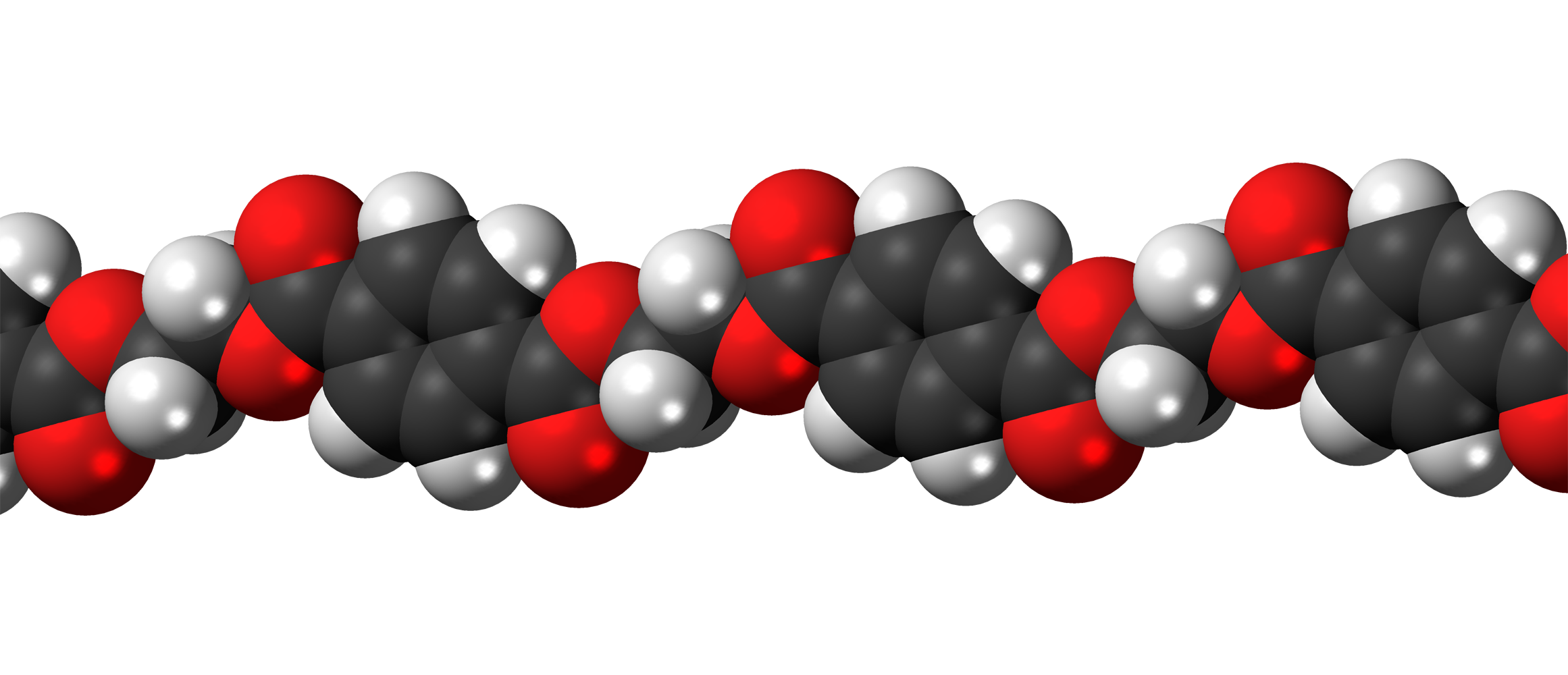

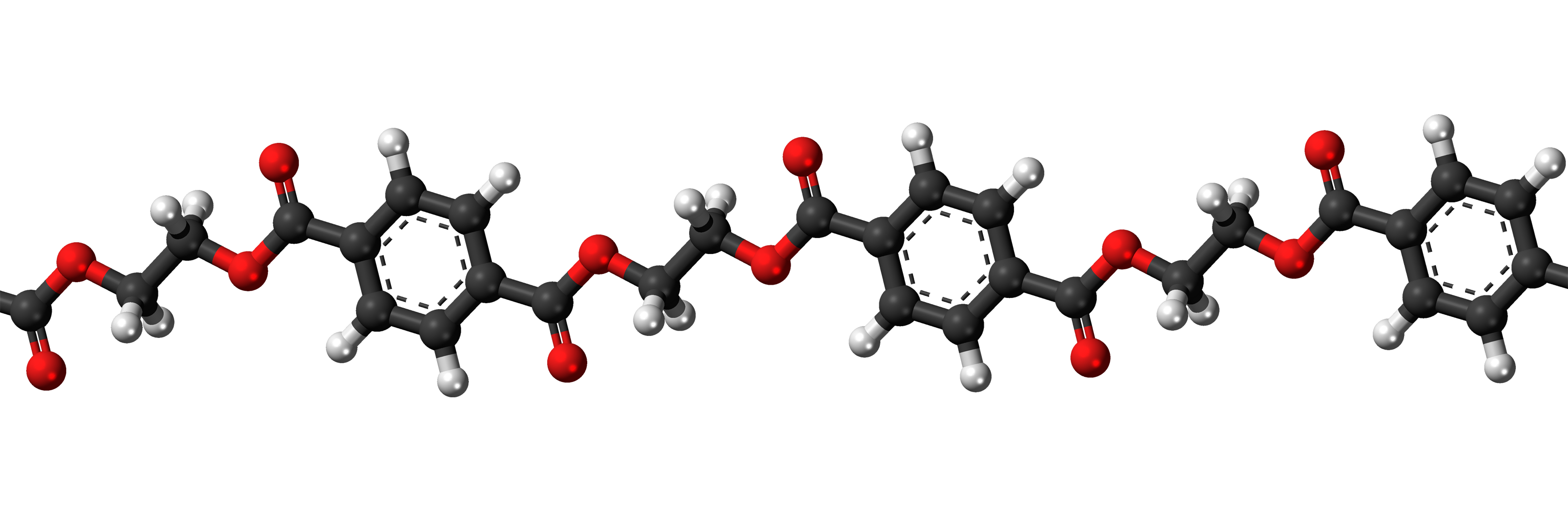

Names
- IUPAC name Poly(ethylene terephthalate)
- Systematic IUPAC name Poly(oxyethyleneoxyterephthaloyl)
- Other names Terylene (trademark); Dacron (trademark).

Identifiers
CAS Number	25038-59-9
Abbreviations	PET, PETE
ChEBI	CHEBI:53259
ChemSpider	None
ECHA InfoCard	100.121.858
UNII	5YSH70HE6K
CompTox Dashboard (EPA)	DTXSID10872790

Properties
Chemical formula	(C_{10}H_{8}O_{4})_{n}
Molar mass	10–50 kg/mol, varies
Density	1.38 g/cm^{3}, 20 °C; 1.370 g/cm^{3}, amorphous; 1.455 g/cm^{3}, single crystal
Melting point	> 250 °C (482 °F; 523 K) 260 °C
Boiling point	> 350 °C (662 °F; 623 K) (decomposes)
Solubility in water	Practically insoluble
log P	0.94540
Thermal conductivity	0.15 to 0.24 W/(m·K)
Refractive index (n_{D})	1.57–1.58, 1.5750

Thermochemistry
Heat capacity (C)	1.0 kJ/(kg·K)

Related compounds
Related monomers	Terephthalic acid Ethylene glycol
- Except where otherwise noted, data are given for materials in their standard state (at 25 °C [77 °F], 100 kPa). verify (what is ?) Infobox references

Polyethylene terephthalate (or poly(ethylene terephthalate), PET, PETE, or the obsolete PETP or PET-P) is the most common thermoplastic polymer resin of the polyester family and is used in fibres for clothing, containers for liquids and foods, and thermoformed parts for manufacturing, and in combination with glass fibre for engineering resins.

In 2025, annual global production of PET was 31 million tons with 2031 projections showing over 40 million tons. In the context of textile applications, PET is referred to by its common name, polyester, whereas the acronym PET is generally used in relation to packaging. PET used in non-fiber applications (i.e. for packaging) makes up about 6% of world polymer production by mass. Including the >60% fraction of polyethylene terephthalate produced for use as polyester fibers, PET is the fourth-most-produced polymer after polyethylene (PE), polypropylene (PP), and polyvinyl chloride (PVC).

PET consists of repeating (C_{10}H_{8}O_{4}) units. It is commonly recycled, and has the digit 1 (♳) as its resin identification code (RIC). The National Association for PET Container Resources (NAPCOR) defines PET as: "Polyethylene terephthalate items referenced are derived from terephthalic acid (or dimethyl terephthalate) and mono ethylene glycol, wherein the sum of terephthalic acid (or dimethyl terephthalate) and mono ethylene glycol reacted constitutes at least 90 percent of the mass of monomer reacted to form the polymer, and must exhibit a melting peak temperature between 225 °C and 255 °C, as identified during the second thermal scan in procedure 10.1 in ASTM D3418, when heating the sample at a rate of 10 °C/minute."

Depending on its processing and thermal history, polyethylene terephthalate may exist both as an amorphous (transparent) and as a semi-crystalline polymer. The semicrystalline material might appear transparent (particle size less than 500 nm) or opaque and white (particle size up to a few micrometers) depending on its crystal structure and particle size.

One process for making PET uses bis(2-hydroxyethyl) terephthalate, which can be synthesized by the esterification reaction between terephthalic acid and ethylene glycol with water as a byproduct (this is also known as a condensation reaction), or by transesterification reaction between ethylene glycol and dimethyl terephthalate (DMT) with methanol as a byproduct. It can also be obtained by recycling of PET. Polymerization is through a polycondensation reaction of the monomers (done immediately after esterification/transesterification) with water as the byproduct.

Young's modulus, E	2800–3100 MPa
Tensile strength, σ_{t}	55–75 MPa
Elastic limit	50–150%
Notch test	3.6 kJ/m^{2}
Glass transition temperature, T_{g}	67–81 °C
Vicat B	82 °C
Linear expansion coefficient, α	7×10^{−5} K^{−1}
Water absorption (ASTM)	0.16

== Uses ==
=== Textiles ===
Polyester fibres are widely used in the textile industry. The invention of the polyester fibre is attributed to J. R. Whinfield. It was first commercialized in the 1940s by ICI, under the brand 'Terylene'. Subsequently E. I. DuPont launched the brand 'Dacron'. As of 2022, there are many brands around the world, mostly Asian.

Polyester fibres are used in fashion apparel often blended with cotton, as heat insulation layers in thermal wear, sportswear and workwear and automotive upholstery.

=== Rigid packaging ===
Plastic bottles made from PET are widely used for soft drinks, both still and sparkling. For beverages that are degraded by oxygen, such as beer, a multilayer structure is used. PET sandwiches an additional polyvinyl alcohol (PVOH) or polyamide (PA) layer to further reduce its oxygen permeability.

Non-oriented PET sheet can be thermoformed to make packaging trays and blister packs. Both amorphous PET and biaxially oriented PET (BoPET) are transparent to the naked eye. Dyes can easily be formulated into PET sheet.

PET is permeable to oxygen and carbon dioxide and this imposes shelf life limitations of contents packaged in PET.

In the early 2000s, the global PET packaging market grew at a compound annual growth rate of 9% to €17 billion in 2006.

=== Flexible packaging ===
Biaxially oriented PET (BoPET) film can be aluminized by evaporating a thin film of metal onto it to reduce its permeability, and to make it reflective and opaque (MPET). These properties are useful in many applications, such as increasing shelf life of products, including flexible food packaging and thermal insulation (such as space blankets).

=== Photovoltaic modules ===
BoPET is used in the backsheet of photovoltaic modules. Most backsheets consist of a layer of BOPET laminated to a fluoropolymer or a layer of UV stabilized BOPET. PET is also used as a substrate in thin film solar cells.

=== Thermoplastic resins ===
PET can be compounded with glass fibre and crystallization accelerators, to make thermoplastic resins. These can be injection moulded into parts such as housings, covers, electrical appliance components and elements of ignition systems.

=== Other applications ===
- A waterproofing barrier in undersea cables.
- As a film base.
- As a fibre, spliced into bell rope tops to help prevent wear on the ropes as they pass through the ceiling.
- Since late 2014 as liner material in type IV composite high pressure gas cylinders. PET works as a much better barrier to oxygen than earlier used low density polyethylene (LDPE).
- As a 3D printing filament, as well as in the 3D printing plastic polyethylene terephthalate glycol (PETG). In 3D printing PETG has become a popular material - used for high-end applications like surgical fracture tables. And in the automotive and aeronautical sectors, among other industrial applications. The surface properties can be modified to make PETG self-cleaning for applications like the fabrication of traffic signs for the manufacture of LED spotlights.
- As one of three layers for the creation of glitter; acting as a plastic core coated with aluminium and topped with plastic to create a light reflecting surface, although as of 2021 many glitter manufacturing companies have begun to phase out the use of PET after calls from organizers of festivals to create bio-friendly glitter alternatives.
- Film for tape applications, such as the carrier for magnetic tape or backing for pressure-sensitive adhesive tapes. Digitalization has caused the virtual disappearance of the magnetic audio and videotape application.
- Water-resistant paper.
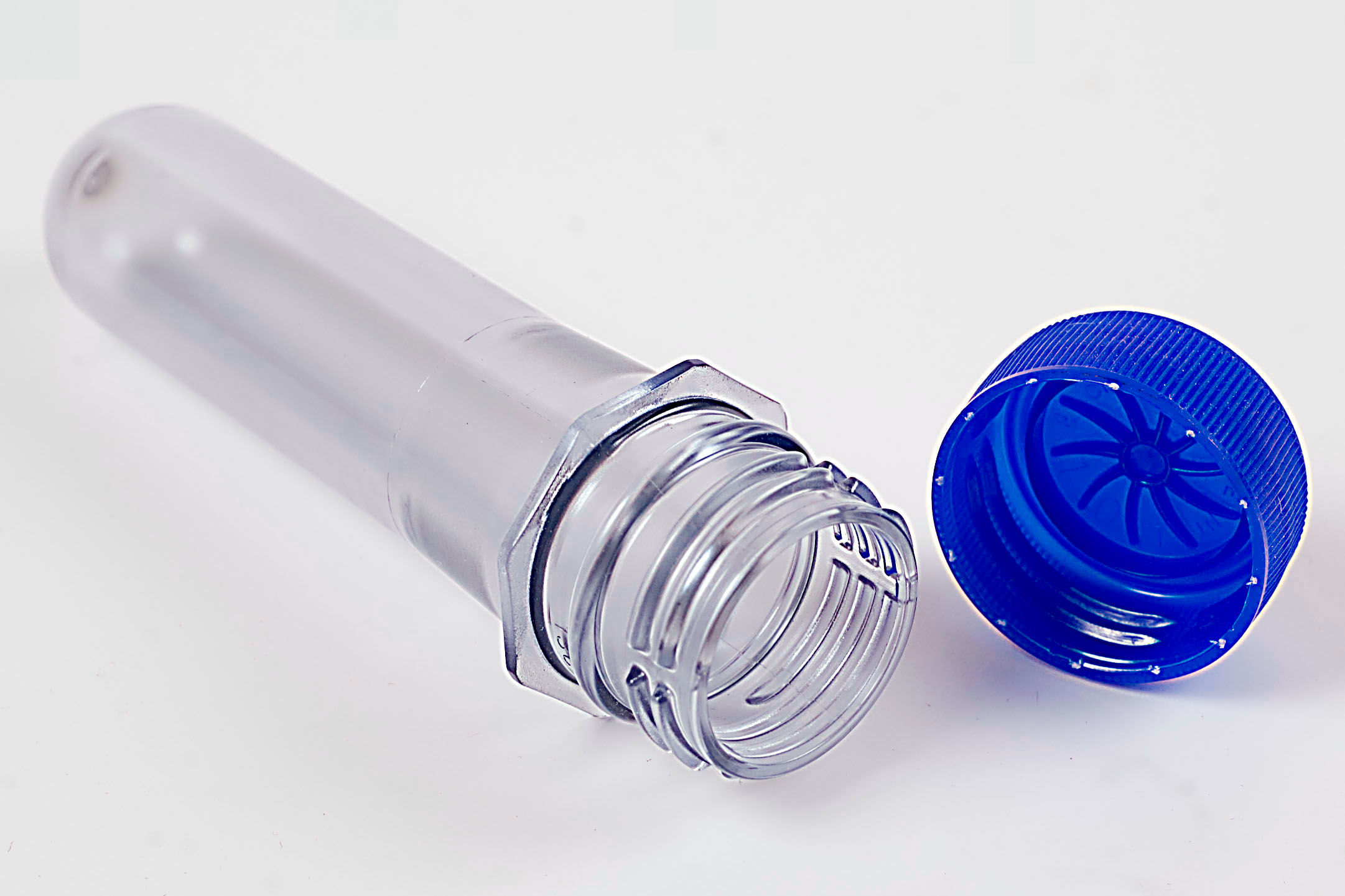
PET preform for injection stretch blow moulding of a bottle

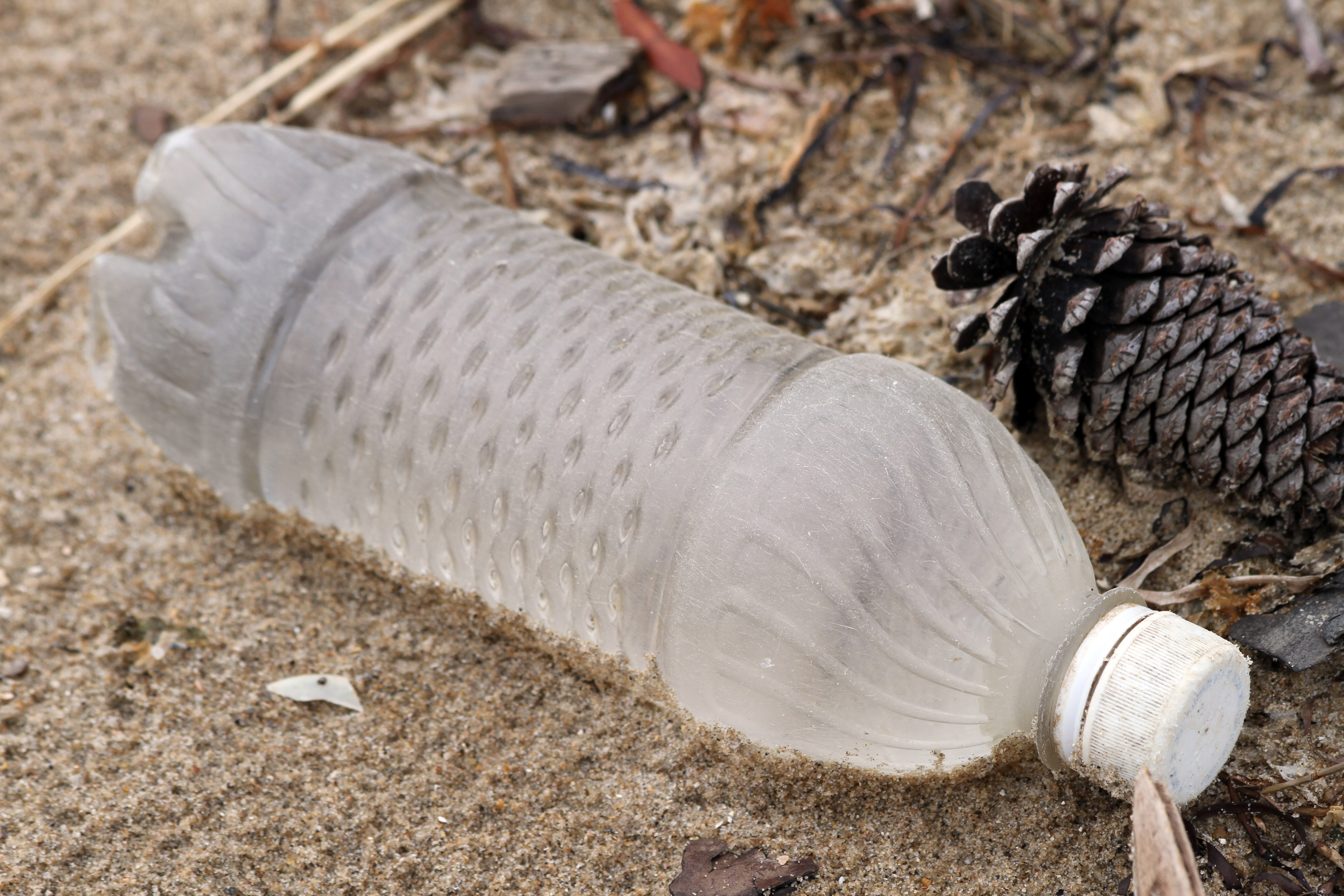
A finished PET bottle

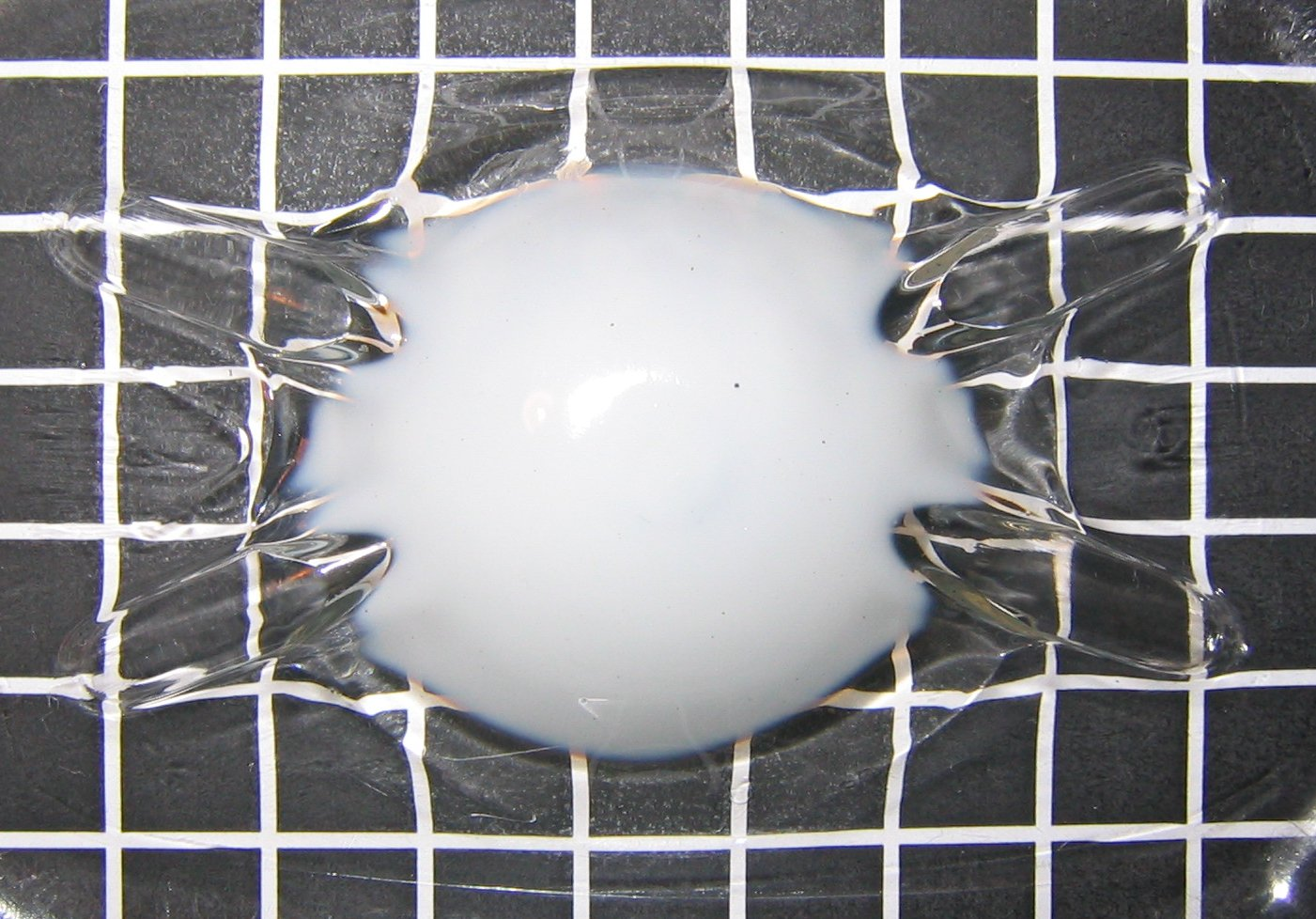
A PET bottle which has been heated by a candle and has recrystallized, making it opaque.

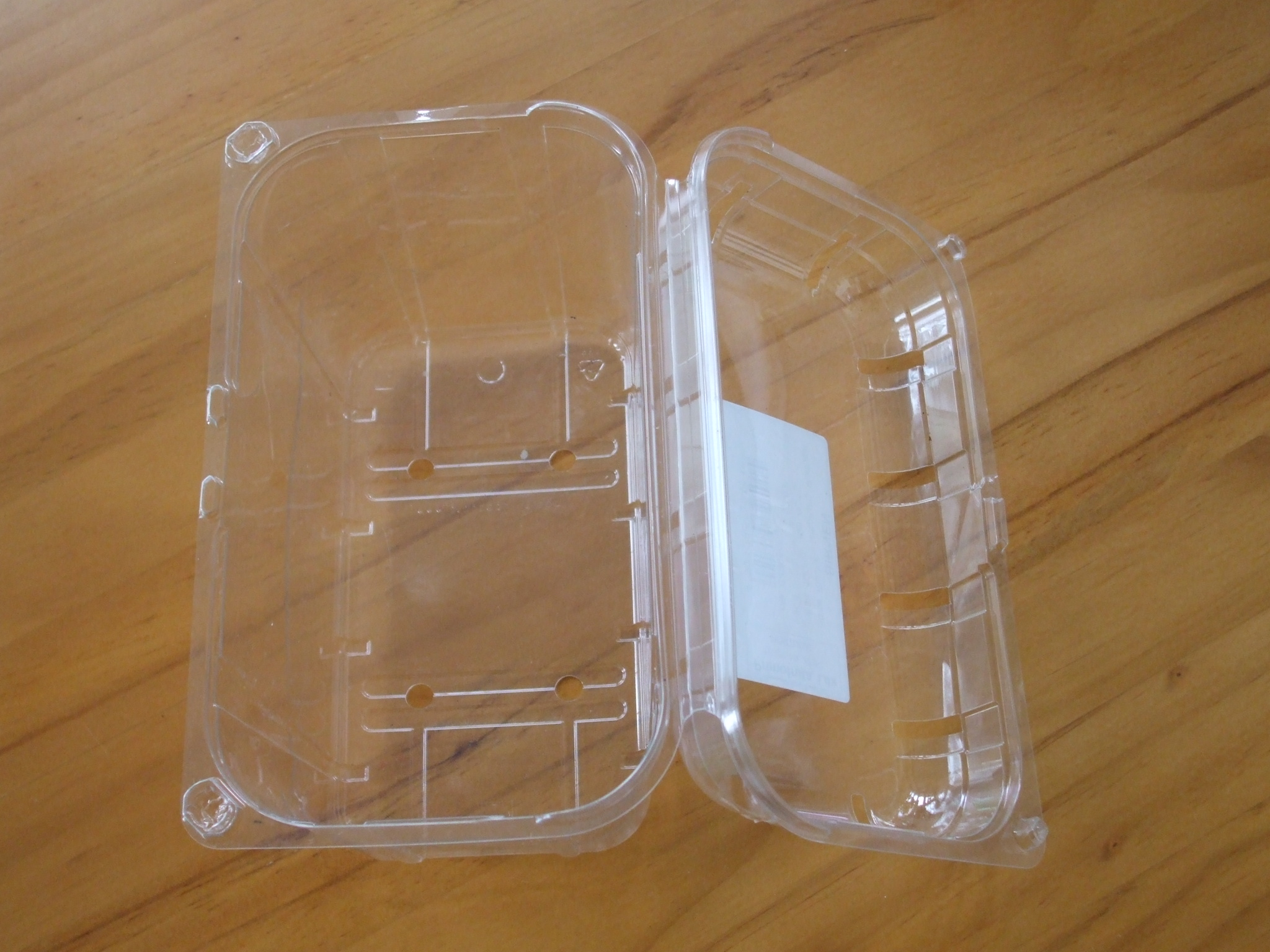
PET clamshell packaging, used to sell fruit, hardware, etc.

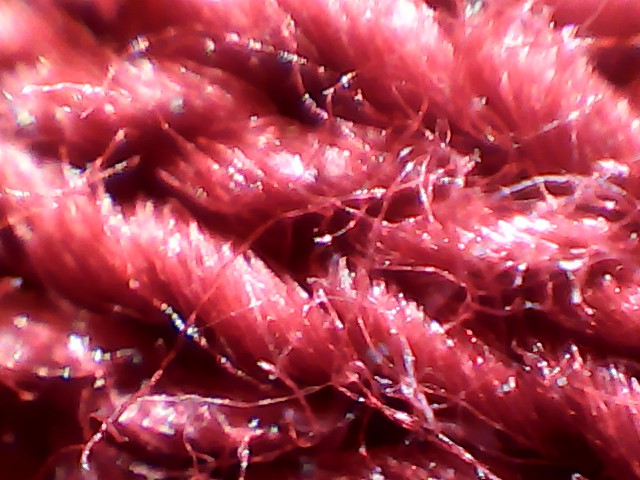
Polyester yarn

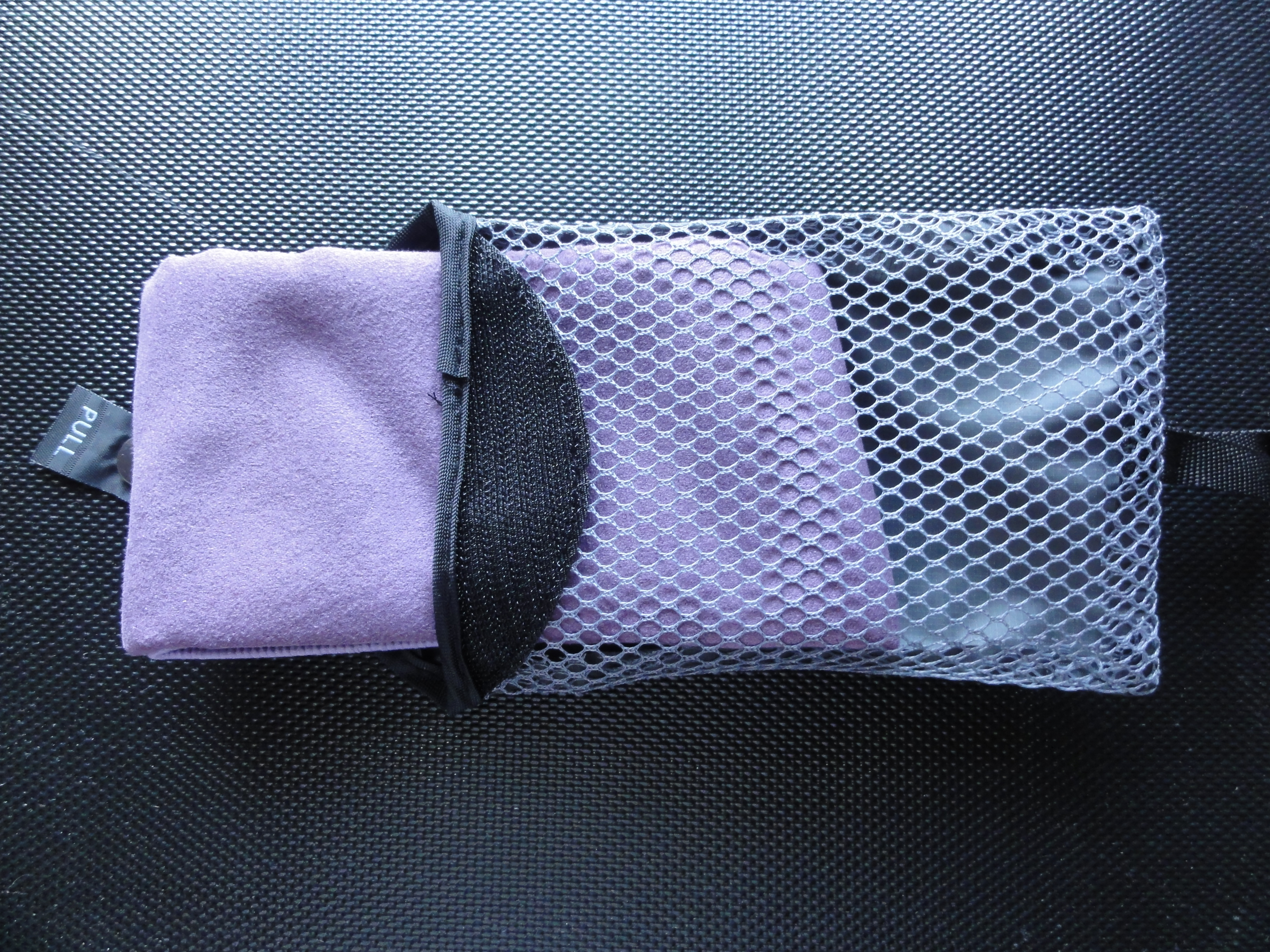
Microfiber towels and cleaning cloths

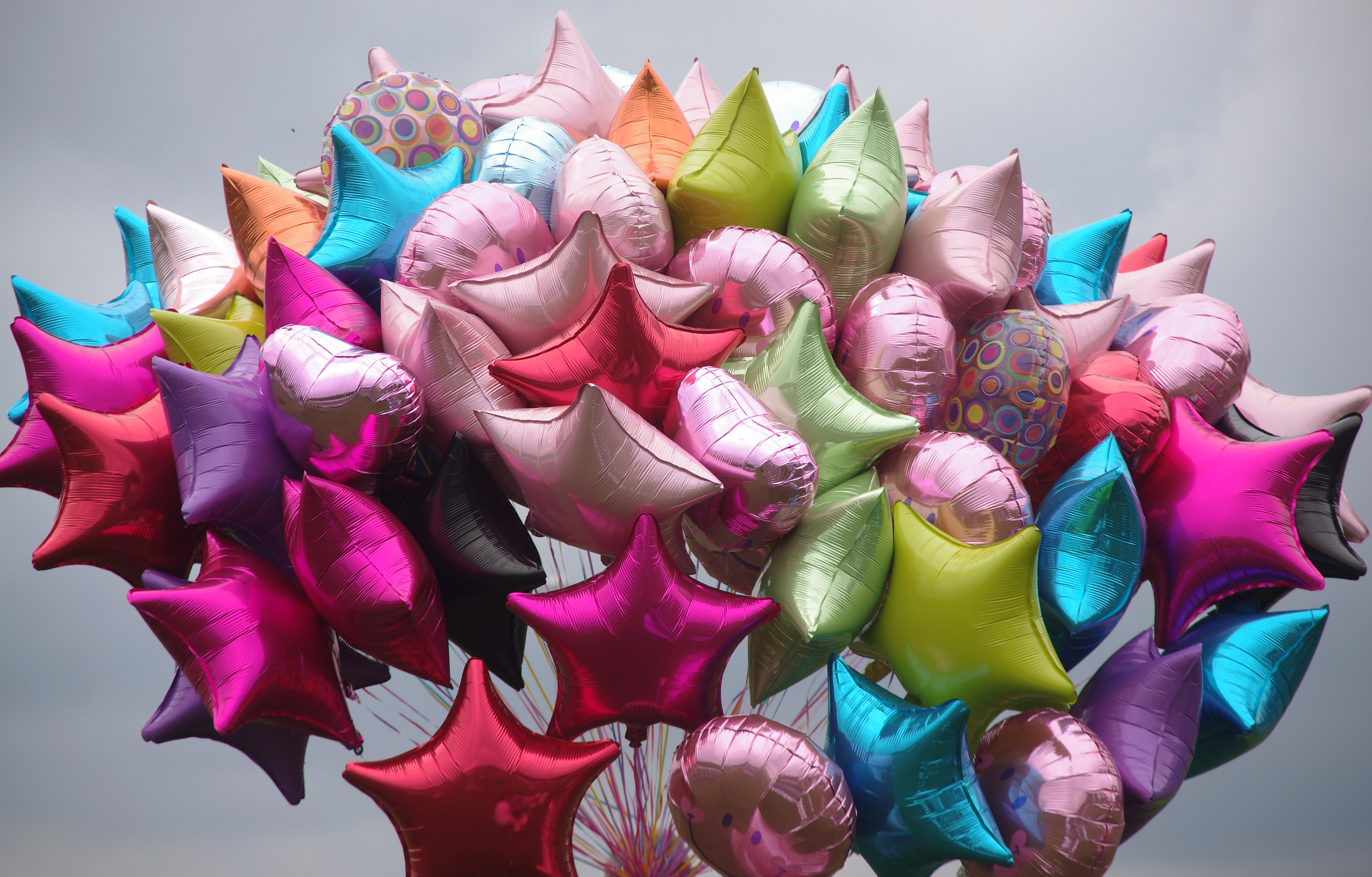
Aluminized Mylar balloons filled with helium

== History ==
PET was patented in 1941 by John Rex Whinfield, James Tennant Dickson and their employer the Calico Printers' Association of Manchester, England. E. I. DuPont de Nemours in Delaware, United States, first produced Dacron (PET fiber) in 1950 and used the trademark Mylar (boPET film) in June 1951 and received registration of it in 1952. It is still the best-known name used for polyester film. The current owner of the trademark is DuPont Teijin Films.

In the Soviet Union, PET was independently developed in the laboratories of the Institute of High-Molecular Compounds of the USSR Academy of Sciences in 1949, and its Russian name "Lavsan" is an acronym thereof (лаборатории Института высокомолекулярных соединений Академии наук СССР).

The PET bottle was invented in 1973 by Nathaniel Wyeth and patented by DuPont.

== Physical properties ==
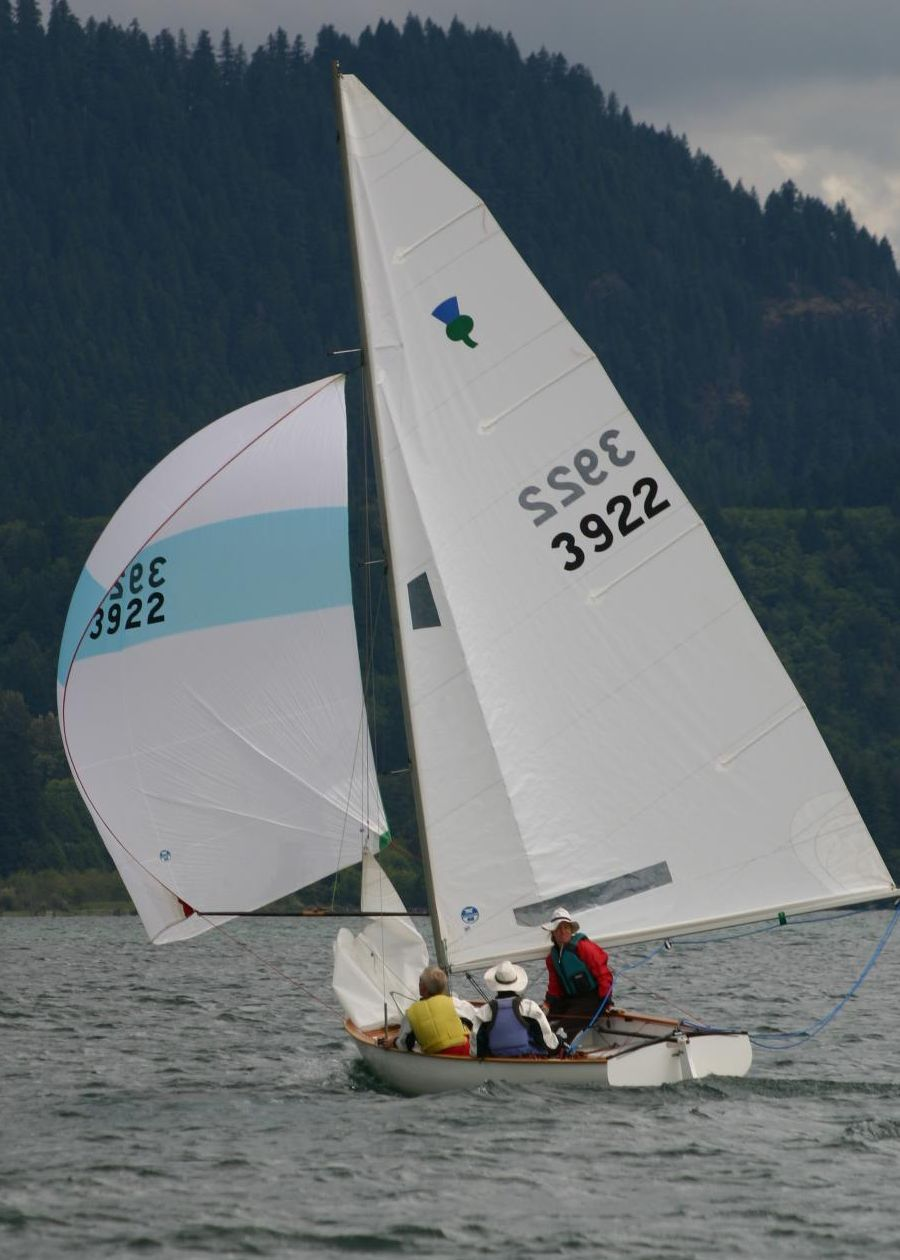
Sailcloth is typically made from PET fibers also known as polyester or under the brand name Dacron; colorful lightweight spinnakers are usually made of nylon.

PET in its most stable state is a colorless, semi-crystalline resin. However it is intrinsically slow to crystallize compared to other semicrystalline polymers. Depending on processing conditions it can be formed into either non-crystalline (amorphous) or crystalline articles. Its amenability to drawing in manufacturing makes PET useful in fibre and film applications. It is strong and impact-resistant. PET is hygroscopic.

Transparent products can be produced by rapidly cooling molten polymer below the glass transition temperature (T_{g}) to form a non-crystalline amorphous solid. Amorphous PET forms by rapidly cooling the melt. This glassy state tends to crystallize upon heating the material above T_{g}, a process known as cold crystallization. Amorphous PET also crystallizes and becomes opaque when exposed to some solvents, such as chloroform or toluene.

A more crystalline product can be produced by cooling the molten polymer slowly. Rather than forming one large single crystal, this material has a number of spherulites (crystallized areas) each containing many small crystallites (grains). Light tends to scatter as it crosses the boundaries between crystallites and the amorphous regions between them, causing the resulting solid to be translucent. Orientation also renders polymers more transparent. This is why BOPET film and bottles are both crystalline, to a degree, and transparent.

=== Flavor absorption ===
PET has an affinity for hydrophobic flavors, and drinks sometimes need to be formulated with a higher flavor dosage, compared to those going into glass, to offset the flavor taken up by the container. When returned for reuse, as in some EU countries, PET's propensity to absorb flavors makes it necessary to conduct a "sniffer test" on some returned bottles to avoid cross-contamination of flavors.

=== Intrinsic viscosity ===
Different applications of PET require different degrees of polymerization, which can be obtained by modifying the process conditions. The molecular weight of PET is measured by solution viscosity. Viscosity is highly dependent on molecular parameters such as chain length and molecular weight. Due to the structural complexity of branched polymers, viscosity-based determination of molecular weight is best used with linear polymers. With dilute solutions, an empirical relationship can be derived between the viscosity and the hydrodynamic volume and molecular weight distribution. The preferred method to measure this viscosity is the intrinsic viscosity (IV) of the polymer. Intrinsic viscosity is a dimensionless measurement found by extrapolating the relative viscosity (measured in (dℓ/g)) to zero concentration. Shown below are the IV ranges for common applications:

Application	IV
Textile fibers	0.40–0.70
Technical fibers (e.g. tire cord)	0.72–0.98
Biaxially oriented PET film (BOPET)	0.60–0.70
Sheet grade film for thermoforming	0.70–1.00
General purpose bottles	0.70–0.78
Carbonated drink bottles	0.78–0.85
Monofilaments and engineering plastics	1.00–2.00

== Copolymers ==
PET is often copolymerized with other diols or diacids to optimize the properties for particular applications.

=== PETG ===
PETG: Ethylene glycol units are marked in blue, and cyclohexane-1,4-dimethanol units are marked in yellow

For example, cyclohexanedimethanol (CHDM) can be added to the polymer backbone, replacing some of the ethylene glycol. Since this building block is much larger (six additional carbon atoms) than the ethylene glycol unit it replaces, it does not fit in with the neighboring chains the way an ethylene glycol unit would. This interferes with crystallization and lowers the polymer's melting temperature. In general, such PET is known as PETG or PET-G (polyethylene terephthalate glycol-modified). It is a clear amorphous thermoplastic that can be injection-molded, sheet-extruded or extruded as filament for 3D printing. PETG can be colored during processing. Replacing all of the ethylene glycol with CHDM gives PCT. PETG is also being researched in bioengineering for material in bone tissue engineering.

=== Isophthalic acid ===
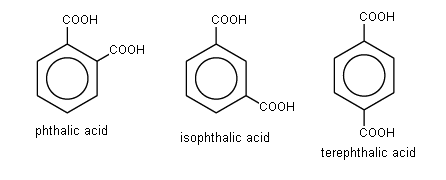
Replacing terephthalic acid (right) with isophthalic acid (center) creates a kink in the PET chain, interfering with crystallization and lowering the polymer's melting point.

Another common modifier is isophthalic acid, replacing some of the 1,4-(para-) linked terephthalate units. The 1,2-(ortho-) or 1,3-(meta-) linkage produces an angle in the chain, which also disturbs crystallinity.

=== Advantages ===
Such copolymers are advantageous for certain molding applications, such as thermoforming, which is used for example to make tray or blister packaging from co-PET film, or amorphous PET sheet (A-PET/PETA) or PETG sheet. On the other hand, crystallization is important in other applications where mechanical and dimensional stability are important, such as seat belts. For PET bottles, the use of small amounts of isophthalic acid, CHDM, diethylene glycol (DEG) or other comonomers can be useful: if only small amounts of comonomers are used, crystallization is slowed but not prevented entirely. As a result, bottles are obtainable via stretch blow molding ("SBM"), which are both clear and crystalline enough to be an adequate barrier to aromas and even gases, such as carbon dioxide in carbonated beverages.

== Production ==
Polyethylene terephthalate is produced largely from purified terephthalic acid (PTA), as well as to a lesser extent from (mono-)ethylene glycol (MEG) and dimethyl terephthalate (DMT). As of 2022, ethylene glycol is made from ethene found in natural gas, while terephthalic acid comes from p-xylene made from crude oil. Typically an antimony or titanium compound is used as a catalyst, a phosphite is added as a stabilizer and a bluing agent such as cobalt salt is added to mask any yellowing.

=== Processes ===
==== Dimethyl terephthalate process ====
Polyesterification reaction in the production of PET

In the dimethyl terephthalate (DMT) process, DMT and excess ethylene glycol (MEG) are transesterified in the melt at 150–200 °C with a basic catalyst. Methanol (CH_{3}OH) is removed by distillation to drive the reaction forward. Excess MEG is distilled off at higher temperature with the aid of vacuum. The second transesterification step proceeds at 270–280 °C, with continuous distillation of MEG as well.

The reactions can be summarized as follows:

First step
C_{6}H_{4}(CO_{2}CH_{3})_{2} + 2 HOCH_{2}CH_{2}OH → C_{6}H_{4}(CO_{2}CH_{2}CH_{2}OH)_{2} + 2 CH_{3}OH

Second step
n C_{6}H_{4}(CO_{2}CH_{2}CH_{2}OH)_{2} → [(CO)C_{6}H_{4}(CO_{2}CH_{2}CH_{2}O)]_{n} + n HOCH_{2}CH_{2}OH

==== Terephthalic acid process ====
Polycondensation reaction in the production of PET

In the terephthalic acid process, MEG and PTA are esterified directly at moderate pressure (2.7–5.5 bar) and high temperature (220–260 °C). Water is eliminated in the reaction, and it is also continuously removed by distillation:

n C_{6}H_{4}(CO_{2}H)_{2} + n HOCH_{2}CH_{2}OH → [(CO)C_{6}H_{4}(CO_{2}CH_{2}CH_{2}O)]_{n} + 2n H_{2}O

==== Bio-PET ====
Bio-PET is the bio-based counterpart of PET. Essentially, in Bio-PET, the MEG is manufactured from ethylene derived from sugar cane ethanol. A better process based on oxidation of ethanol has been proposed, and it is also technically possible to make PTA from readily available bio-based furfural.

=== Bottle processing equipment ===
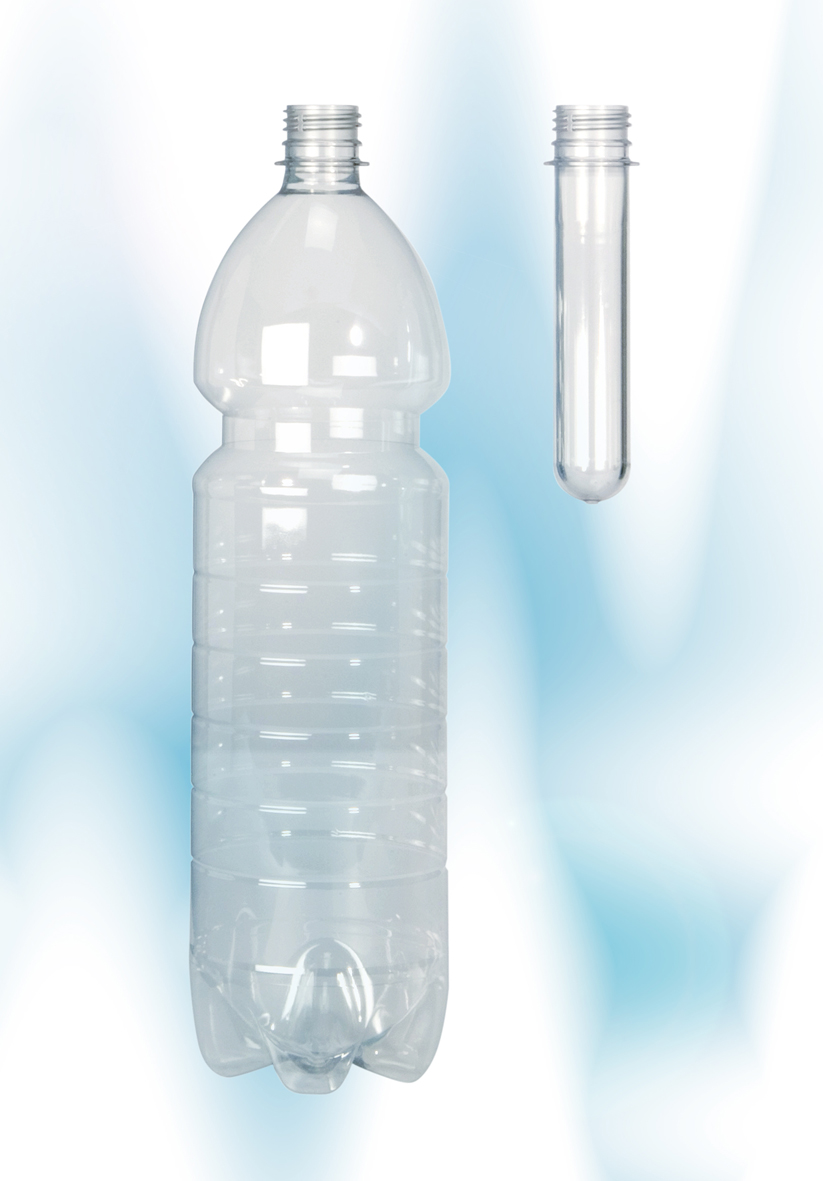
A finished PET drink bottle compared to the preform from which it is made

PET bottles are produced by injection molding preforms and then forming them into finished containers by stretch blow molding. These operations can be performed within one machine in a one-step (single-stage) process, or in separate machines in a two-step (two-stage) process.

In the two-step process, the first machine injection molds the preform, which resembles a test tube with the bottle neck and cap threads already formed. The preforms are cooled and can be stored or supplied to another manufacturer for subsequent blowing. In the second machine, they are reheated, typically using infrared heaters, and stretched lengthwise with a core rod while compressed air expands them against the mold to form the finished bottles.

In the one-step process, preform manufacture and bottle blowing take place within the same machine. Heat retained from injection molding can be used during the blowing stage. Preform design and temperature conditioning can be tailored to produce non-round containers and unusual neck shapes.

=== Degradation ===
PET is subject to degradation during processing. If the moisture level is too high, hydrolysis will reduce the molecular weight by chain scission, resulting in brittleness. If the residence time and/or melt temperature (temperature at melting) are too high, then thermal degradation or thermooxidative degradation will occur resulting in discoloration and lowered molecular weight, as well as the formation of acetaldehyde, and the formation "gel" or "fish-eye" formations through cross-linking. Mitigation measures include copolymerisation with other monomers like CHDM or isophthalic acid, which lower the melting point and thus the melt temperature of the resin, as well as the addition of polymer stabilisers such as phosphites.

==== Acetaldehyde ====
Acetaldehyde, which can form by degradation of PET after mishandling of the material, can cause an off-taste in bottled water. As well as high temperatures (PET decomposes above 300 °C or 570 °F) and long barrel residence times, high pressures and high extruder speeds (which cause shear raising the temperature), can also contribute to the production of acetaldehyde. Photo-oxidation can also cause the formation of acetaldehyde. This conversion proceeds via a Type II Norrish reaction.

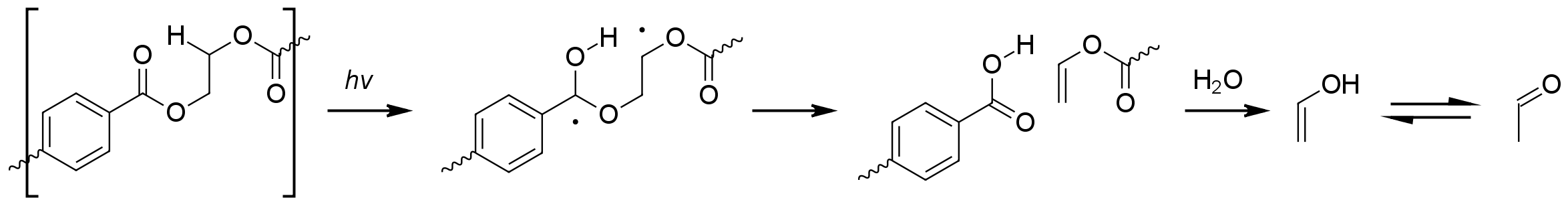

When acetaldehyde is produced, some of it remains dissolved in the walls of a container and then diffuses into the product stored inside, altering the taste and aroma. This is not such a problem for non-consumables (such as shampoo), for fruit juices (which already contain acetaldehyde), or for strong-tasting drinks like soft drinks. But for bottled water, low acetaldehyde content is quite important, because if nothing masks the aroma, even extremely low concentrations (10–20 parts per billion in the water) of acetaldehyde can produce an off-taste.

== Safety and environmental concerns ==
Commentary published in Environmental Health Perspectives in April 2010 suggested that PET might yield endocrine disruptors under conditions of common use and recommended research on this topic. Proposed mechanisms include leaching of phthalates as well as leaching of antimony. A 2012 article in Journal of Environmental Monitoring concludes that antimony concentration in deionized water stored in PET bottles stays within EU's acceptable limit even if stored briefly at temperatures up to 60 °C (140 °F), while bottled contents (water or soft drinks) may occasionally exceed the EU limit after less than a year of storage at room temperature.

=== Antimony ===
Antimony (Sb) is a metalloid element that is used as a catalyst in the form of compounds such as antimony trioxide (Sb_{2}O_{3}) or antimony triacetate in the production of PET. After manufacturing, a detectable amount of antimony can be found on the surface of the product. This residue can be removed with washing. Antimony also remains in the material itself and can, thus, migrate out into food and drinks. Exposing PET to boiling or microwaving can increase the levels of antimony significantly, possibly above US EPA maximum contamination levels.

The drinking water limit assessed by WHO is 20 parts per billion (WHO, 2003), and the drinking water limit in the United States is 6 parts per billion. Although antimony trioxide is of low toxicity when taken orally, its presence is still of concern.

The Swiss Federal Office of Public Health investigated the amount of antimony migration, comparing waters bottled in PET and glass: The antimony concentrations of the water in PET bottles were higher, but still well below the allowed maximum concentration. The Swiss Federal Office of Public Health concluded that small amounts of antimony migrate from the PET into bottled water, but that the health risk of the resulting low concentrations is negligible (1% of the "tolerable daily intake" determined by the WHO). A later (2006) but more widely publicized study found similar amounts of antimony in water in PET bottles. The WHO has published a risk assessment for antimony in drinking water. Fruit juice concentrates (for which no guidelines are established), however, that were produced and bottled in PET in the UK were found to contain up to 44.7 μg/L of antimony, well above the EU limits for tap water of 5 μg/L.

=== Shed microfibres ===
Clothing sheds microfibres in use, during washing and machine drying. Plastic litter slowly forms small particles. Microplastics which are present on the bottom of the river or seabed can be ingested by small marine life, thus entering the food chain. As PET has a higher density than water, a significant amount of PET microparticles may be precipitated in sewage treatment plants. PET microfibers generated by apparel wear, washing or machine drying can become airborne, and be dispersed into fields, where they are ingested by livestock or plants and end up in the human food supply. A study published in the journal Science of the Total Environment found PET accounted for 18% of microplastics in human lung tissue samples, and that there were 0.69 ± 0.84 microplastics per gram of lung tissue.

SAPEA have declared that such particles 'do not pose a widespread risk'. PET is known to degrade when exposed to sunlight and oxygen. As of 2016, scarce information exists regarding the life-time of the synthetic polymers in the environment.

== Polyester recycling ==
Resin identification code 1

Alternate 1

Alternate 2

Recycled PET, commonly abbreviated rPET, is used to manufacture new bottles, polyester fibers for clothing and carpets, fiberfill, strapping, and thermoformed packaging. In Switzerland, the Federal Office for the Environment reported a PET recycling rate of 82% for 2020.

PET can be recycled mechanically or chemically. Mechanical recycling generally involves sorting, size reduction, washing, drying, and melt reprocessing, for example by extrusion. It aims to retain the polymer, although heat, moisture, and contaminants can cause degradation during processing and affect the properties of the recycled material.

Chemical recycling breaks down PET into monomers or oligomers that can be purified and used to synthesize PET or other polymers. Hydrolysis can recover terephthalic acid and ethylene glycol, while methanolysis produces dimethyl terephthalate and ethylene glycol. Glycolysis with ethylene glycol can produce bis(2-hydroxyethyl) terephthalate (BHET), which can be used to make PET again.

Glycolysis using other glycols and additional reactants can produce aromatic polyester polyols suitable for use in polyurethane manufacture. Products obtained by glycolysis of post-consumer PET bottles have also been used to synthesize epoxy resins for paints.

In a 2024 study, PET bottle waste was converted into carbon dots and thin carbon nanosheets through a hydrothermal process. The resulting material was tested as an electrode material for supercapacitors.

Industrial investment announcements have included Eastman's 2021 plans for a methanolysis-based polyester recycling facility in Kingsport, Tennessee, and a 2022 announcement by Carbios and Indorama Ventures of plans for an enzymatic PET recycling plant in France.

PET waste can also undergo energy recovery through incineration in waste-to-energy plants, which recover energy as heat or electricity.

=== Biodegradation ===
PET can be depolymerized by enzymes that hydrolyze its ester bonds. In 2016, researchers reported that the bacterium Ideonella sakaiensis could use PET as a major carbon and energy source. Its PETase and MHETase enzymes act sequentially: PETase breaks down PET to primarily produce mono(2-hydroxyethyl) terephthalic acid (MHET), and MHETase hydrolyzes this intermediate to terephthalic acid and ethylene glycol.

Enzymatic depolymerization is being investigated as a route for PET recycling. Research includes improving the catalytic activity and thermal stability of PET-degrading enzymes to make them suitable for industrial processing.

== See also ==
- BoPET (biaxially oriented PET)
- Bioplastic
- Plastic recycling
- Polycyclohexylenedimethylene terephthalate—a polyester with a similar structure to PET
- Solar water disinfection—a method of disinfecting water using only sunlight and plastic PET bottles
